= Australian rules football in the Middle East =

Australian rules football in the Middle East describes the minority sport of Australian rules football as it is watched and played in the Middle East region.

The sport is played at various levels, mainly by expatriate Australians. The main cup competition played in the area is the Dubai 9s, although a regional league under the name AFL Middle East which commenced in October 2008, with the inaugural 2008/09 premiers being the Dubai Heat. The AFLME initially featured six clubs, three in Dubai and one each from Abu Dhabi, Muscat and Doha.

Australian football is not known as a spectator sport in the Middle East. The first Australian Football League exhibition match was played in the United Emirates in 2008. The only matches broadcast are AFL matches (particularly the AFL Grand Final) on satellite television in some countries through the Australia Network and on cable television in Israel.

== Bahrain ==
The Bahrain Blues were created in 2009, making their debut at the Dubai 9s tournament that year. They will enter the AFL Middle East as the league's seventh club for the season starting in October 2009.

== Iraq ==
Servicemen, mostly Australians in Iraq played a game on ANZAC Day in 2008 in the colours of Essendon Bombers and Collingwood Magpies to celebrate The ANZAC Day clash.

=== Iraqi players in the AFL/AFLW ===
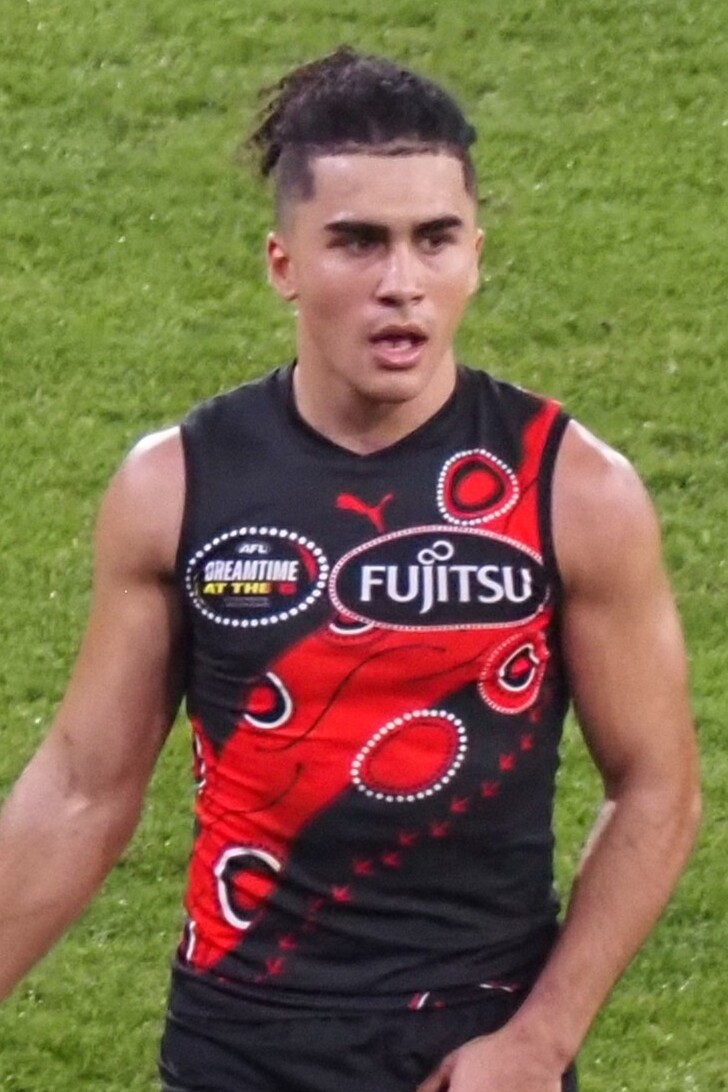
Isaac Kako playing for Essendon in 2025

Player	AFL/AFLW Years*	AFL/AFLW Matches*	AFL/AFLW Goals*	Connections to Iraq, References
Isaac Kako	2025-	23	15	Parents

== Israel and Palestine ==
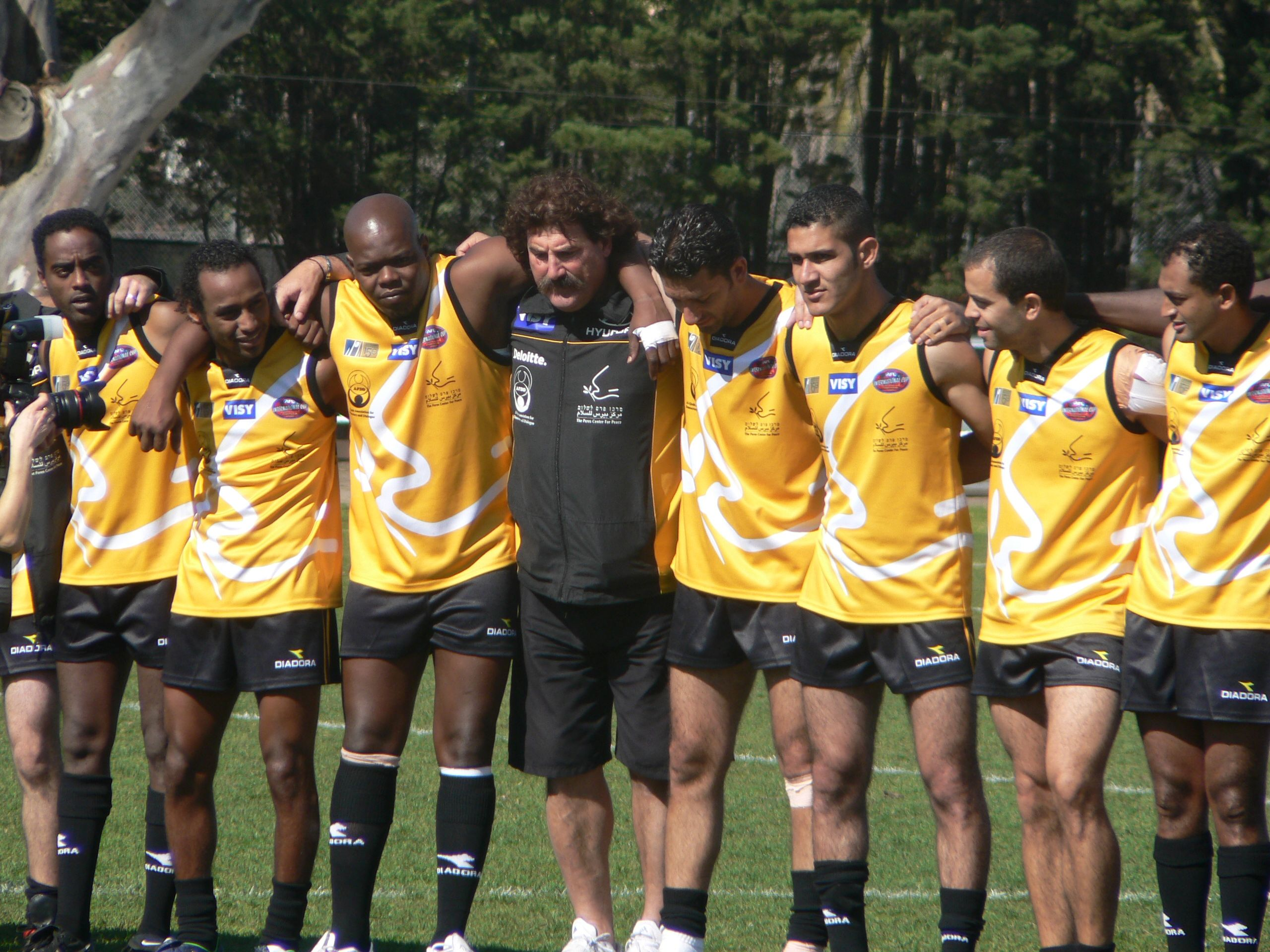
Peres Peace team at the 2008 International Cup

Australian Rules in Israel has been played sporadically since the 1980s.

The earliest mentions of the sport were in the mid-1980s.

In the 1970s, there was no Aussie Rules, and expatriate Australian player David Stark took up rugby and playing in the lock position was part of the national rugby team in the 70s and 80s.

By 1984 a small band of followers was noted to be playing informally in 1984 in Tel Aviv, Jerusalem and Yerucham parks. In 1986, groups of 24 players from the British Olim Society gathered to play matches following viewing of television footage of the VFL Grand Final.

In 1995, when a group of around 20 players began regular social matches in Tel Aviv, although most of the players were based in Jerusalem. By 2005 the community was still playing with around 70 players involved and discussion about creating a four-team league with sides from Tel Aviv, Jerusalem and various youth programs. The majority of the playing base were the members of the Jewish community in Melbourne who have emigrated to Israel.

For political reasons Israel is affiliated with the European chapter of the AFL organisation and participates in its events.

A side representing Israel competed in both years of the Australian Football Multicultural Cup, winning the 2004 competition.

A team composed of Australian Jews resident in London competed as Israel in the 2005 EU Cup.

Highlights of the AFL Grand Final have been shown on Fox Sports Israel.

An idea to utilise the game Australian rules football as an instrument for forging peace between Israelis and Palestinians was suggested and carried out by Tanya Oziel of the Australian Jewish community in Sydney in late 2007.

Consequently the AFL Peace Team project was created by Tanya Oziel and curated by Peres Center for Peace and Innovation. This team was composed mainly of basketball and soccer players and volunteers, trained from scratch in the first half of 2008 to participate in 2008 Australian Football International Cup that took place in August 2008 in Australia. The project received a wide support in Australian business, sport and social circles, including Australian Jewish businessman and Carlton Football Club president Dick Pratt and AFL legend Ron Barassi.

In early 2008 there were initially around 75 players in training for the team, which was cut back to around 26 (13 Israelis, 13 Palestinians) for the squad to attend the International Cup. Match-day coach for the team at the tournament was former player Robert DiPierdomenico.

The Peace Team also returned for the Australian Football International Cup in 2011. The project ended shortly thereafter.

A few of the AFL Peace Team's graduates led by Yonatan Belik went on to establish the Jerusalem Peace Lions football club (JPL) in May 2015 continuing the peace effort. Team's management was actively recruiting both Israeli and Palestinian players residing in Jerusalem and surrounding areas. The club competed internationally representing Israel and the region in the 3 consecutive AFL Euro Cups 2015-2017.

In May 2018 a few former JPL players moved to Tel Aviv, and led by Shir Shalev started training in the Yarkon Park. In August 2018 they partnered with the sports platform OddBalls and formed the Tel Aviv Cheetahs football club. The Cheetahs and OddBalls are more focused on developing the sport itself rather than the activist work previously done by Peace Team and JPL, aiming to embed Australian rules football into Israeli cultural context and attract more local players. Prioritising the grassroots way of development the club's led to the club's squad being 3/4 Israeli. This allows the team to have a better chance at international European tournaments organised by AFL Europe, despite recent restrictions on the amount of Australian-born and raised participants allowed in the roster. Being the only active footy club in the region in 2018, the club went on to represent Israel internationally at the AFL Euro Cup 2018 in Cork, Ireland.

In May 2019 OddBalls and the Tel Aviv Cheetahs' management formed a national team, the Israeli Beasts, aiming to represent Israel in the AFL Euro Cup 2019 that will take place on 29 June in Sweden.

In 2023, a team representing the Tel Aviv Cheetahs travelled to Bulgaria to participate in a four-team tournament. The tournament also included two teams from London and a local Bulgarian team made up of players from the Sofia and Varna teams.

Later the same year, Israel hosted its first Australian Rules international tournament in the city of Be'er Sheva to commemorate ANZAC day. the tournament included two Israeli teams, a team from the United Arab Emirates, and a team representing the Vienna Galahs. The tournament was won by the team from the UAE, and video from the tournament was hosted on the AFL's social media channels.

== Lebanon ==
Australian rules football in Lebanon was first played around 2003 and 2004 in an attempt to introduce the sport into that country by members of the Lebanese community resident in Melbourne, this competition (based in Tripoli) has since gone into recess and there is no Australian rules currently played in Lebanon.

A team representing the Melbourne Lebanese community also competed at the Australian Football Multicultural Cup in both 2004, 2005, 2010 & 2011, winning the cup three times and then a fourth in 2014.

Team Lebanon was taken over by new president and head coach Rick Kerbatieh, who successfully coached the team to its fourth Harmony Cup in 2014 and is preparing the team for the World Cup in 2015. Rick has coached a record 10 grand final wins with team Lebanon.

Rick is currently looking at expanding the game in Lebanon once again and is working behind the scenes in an attempt to set up a Team Lebanon sporting academy.

In 2018, the inaugural Mediterranean Cup Team Lebanon came from behind and won the competition.

Lebanon also has a national Australian rules football team, nicknamed the "Lebanese Falcons".

=== Lebanese players in the AFL/AFLW ===
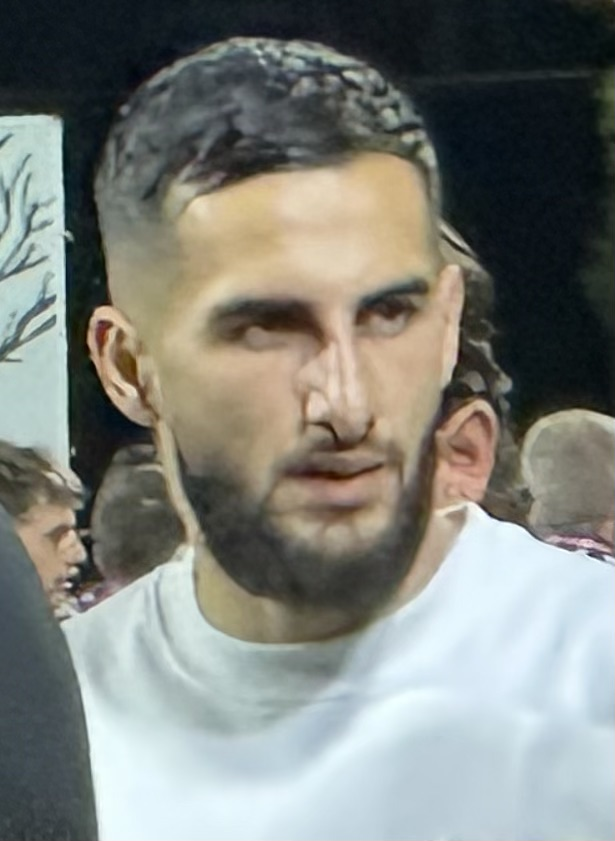
Saad El-Hawli in 2025

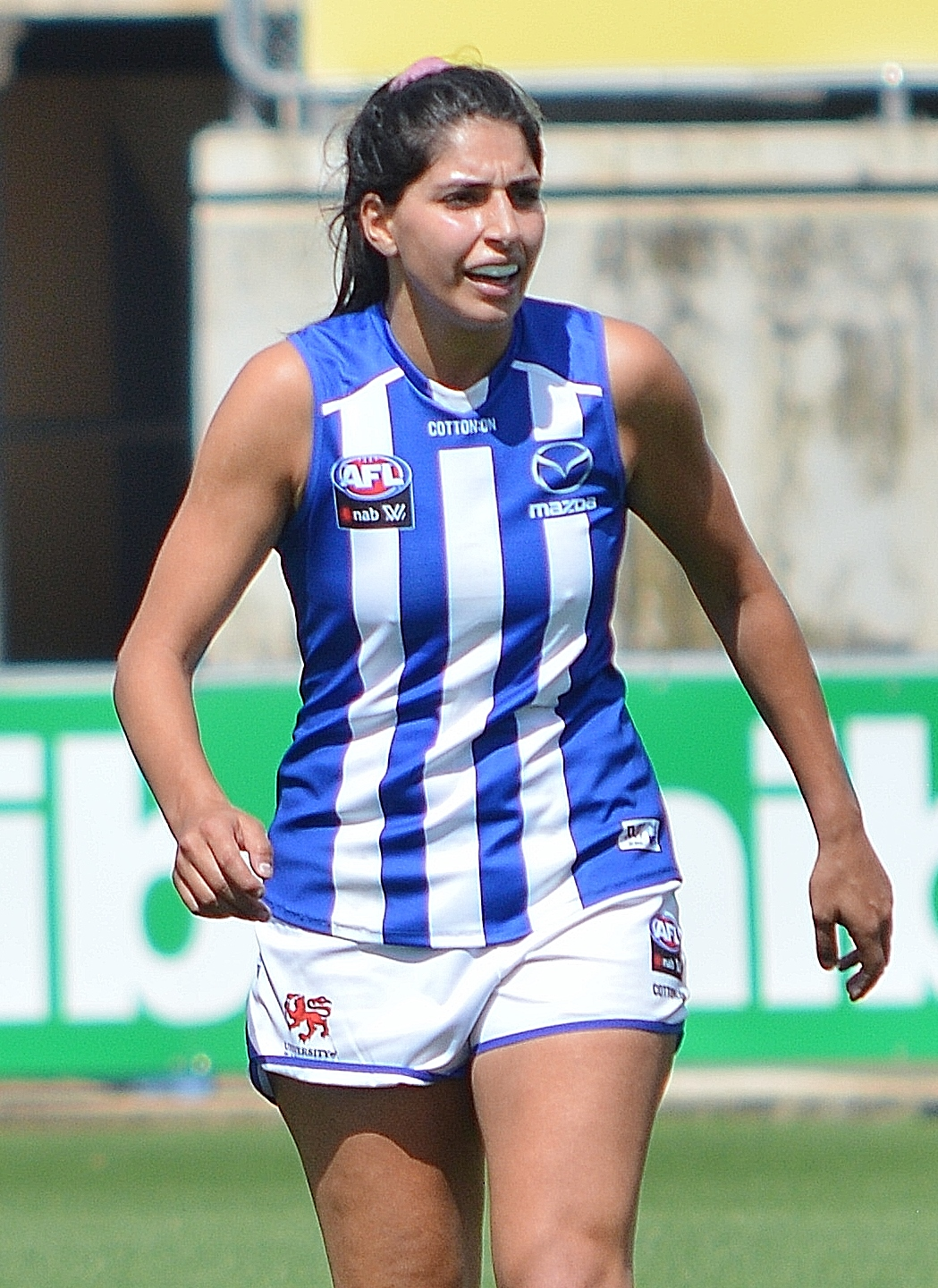
Vivien Saad in 2020

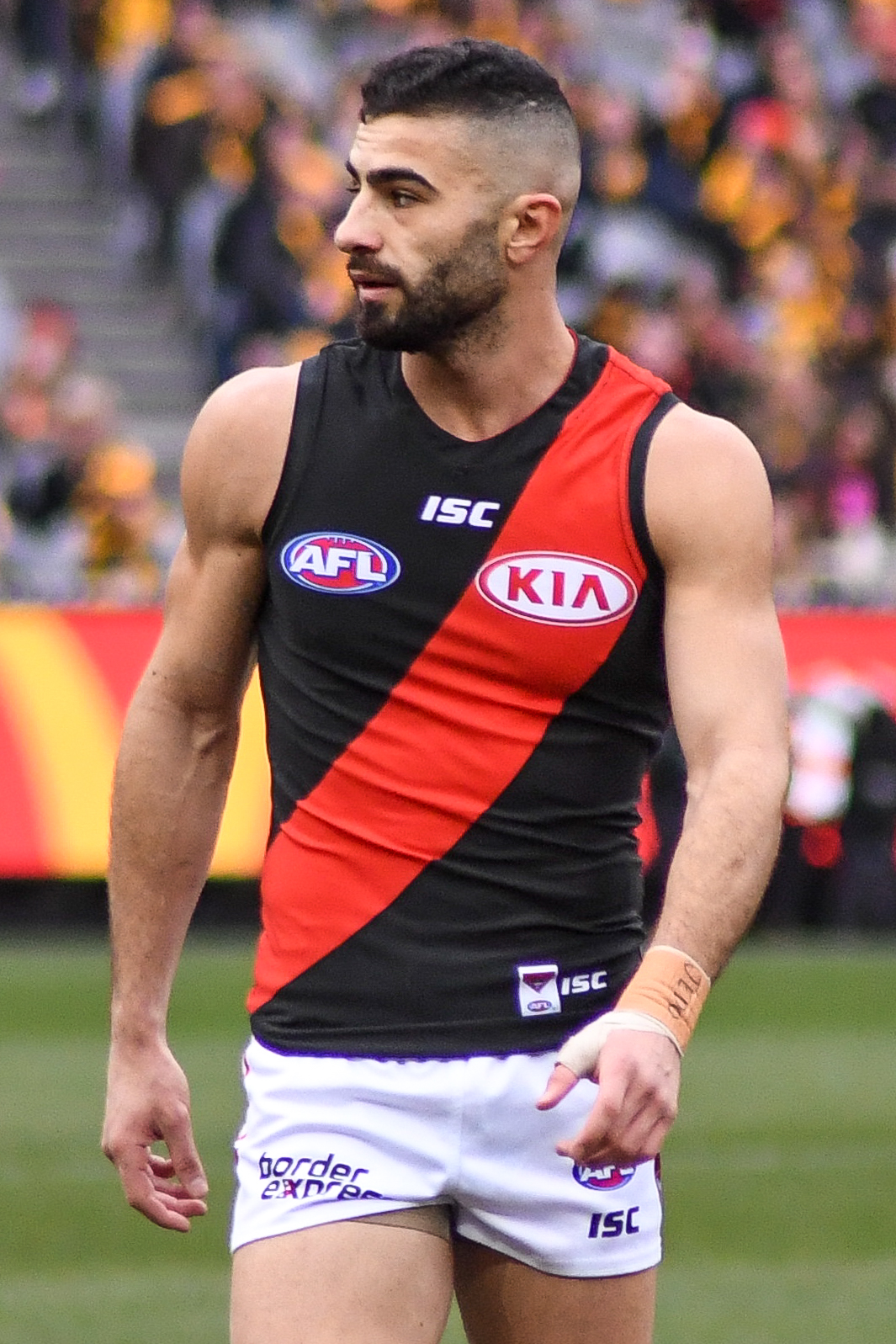
Adam Saad in 2018

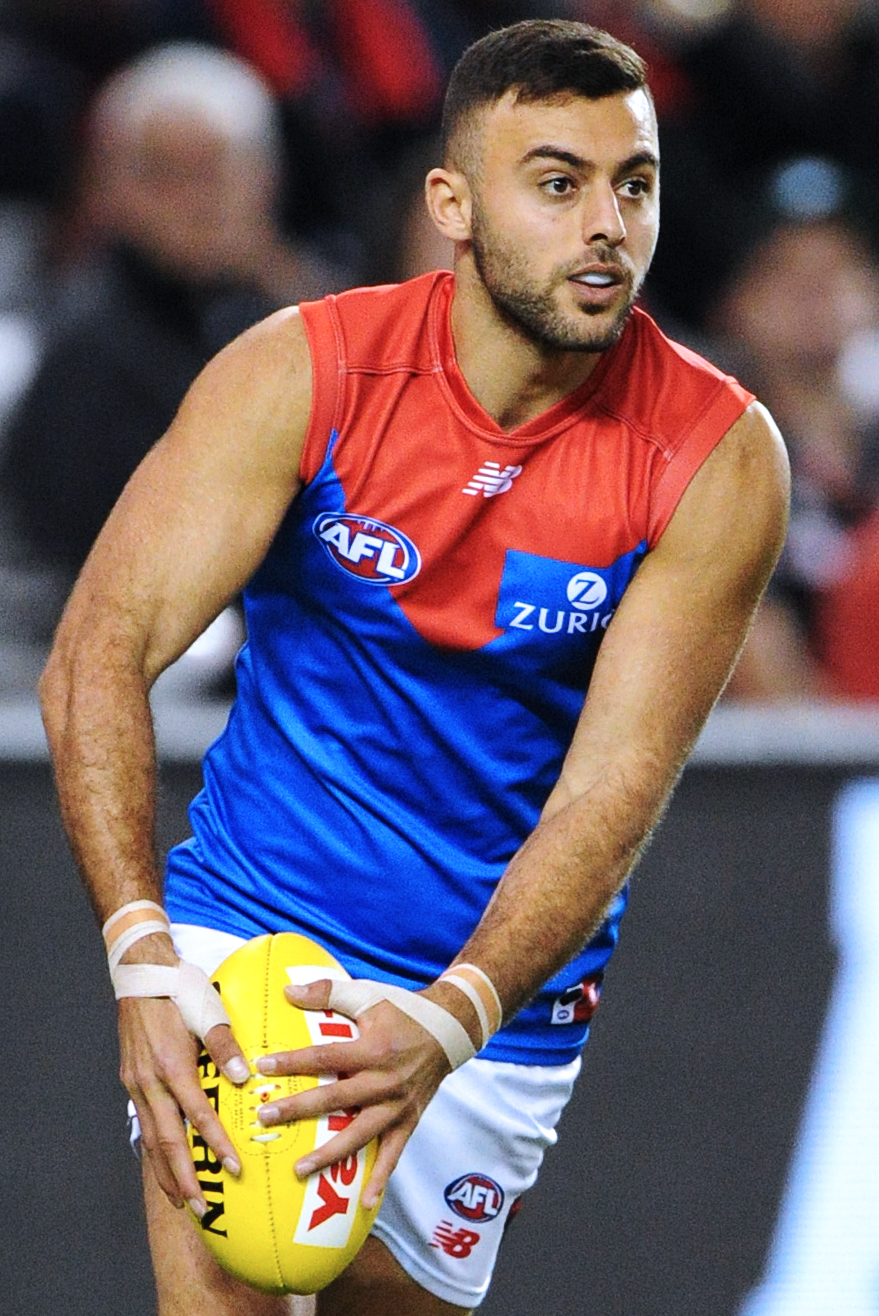
Christian Salem in 2018

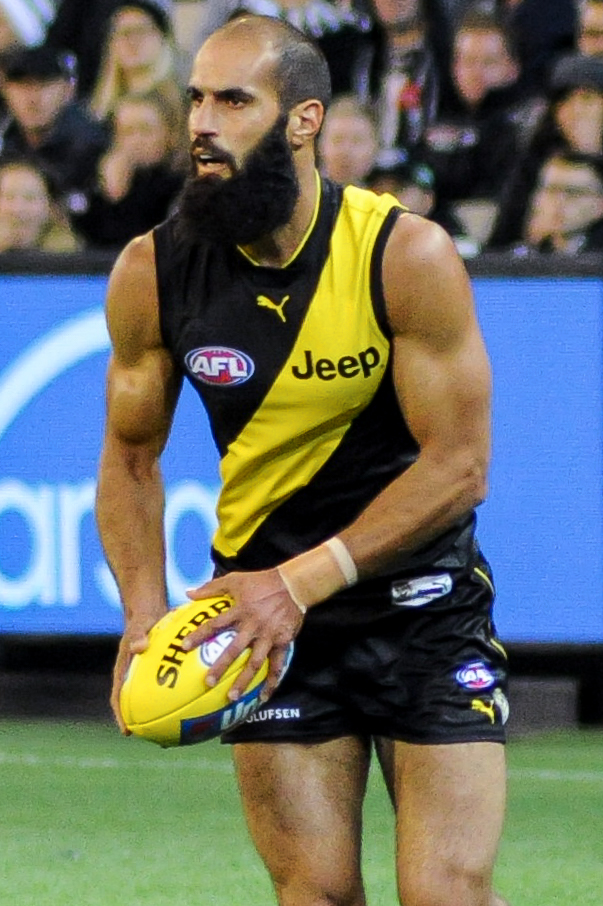
Bachar Houli in 2017

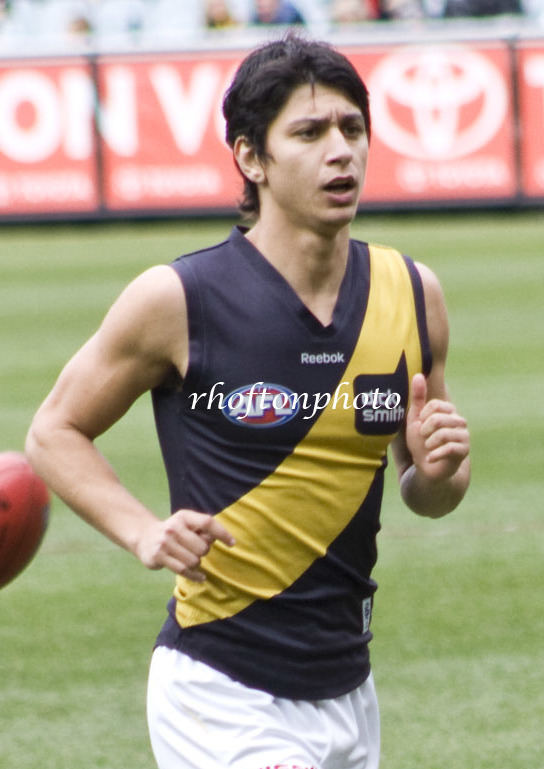
Robin Nahas in 2009

Player	AFL/AFLW Years*	AFL/AFLW Matches*	AFL/AFLW Goals*	Connections to Lebanon, References
Saad El-Hawli	2024-	7	1	Parents
Emelia Yassir	2021-	29	16	Parents
Vivien Saad	2020-	43	0	Parents
Haneen Zreika	2018-	48	9	Parents
Adam Saad	2015-	184	10	Parents
Christian Salem	2014-	173	26	Father.
Bachar Houli	2022	154	10	Parents
Robin Nahas	2009-2016	117	135	Parents
Mil Hanna	1986–1997	190	83	Born Qantara

== Oman ==
A group of players from Oman appeared at the 2007 Dubai 9s. The Dubai Dingos followed the Dubai 9s by scheduling a match against the Omani side, which was partly composed of Gaelic football converts. In 2008, the Muscat Magpies were formed as the country's first formal club. The Magpies compete in the upcoming AFL Middle East.

== Qatar ==
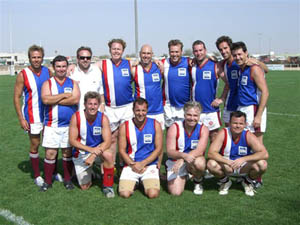
Doha Kangaroos at the 2007 Dubai 9s

An Australian rules football club nicknamed the Kangaroos was founded in Doha, Qatar in early 2007, with their first appearance being at that year's Dubai 9s tournament. The Squad is made up of expatriate Australians.

The Doha Kangaroos were a founding member of the AFL Middle East.

== United Arab Emirates ==
Australian Rules in the United Arab Emirates has been played since 2006, with the creation of a club in Dubai known as the Dubai Dingoes. In addition to the senior team, there is junior football held weekly. The club is mainly composed of expatriate Australians as well as Irish from the local gaelic football club. The Dingoes held a 9-a-side international tournament in early 2007, also featuring teams from Abu Dhabi, Oman and Qatar.

A second and more successful club called the Dubai Heat was created in 2007.

A team mainly drawn from the Dubai Heat, but also with some players from the Dubai Dingoes, represented the UAE at the 2007 Asian Australian Football Championships. In 2008 Dubai Heat entered another team in the Asian championships and successfully took the title beating the Singapore Wombats.

In February 2008, the first AFL match in the United Arab Emirates was held at the Ghantoot Polo and Racing Club in Abu Dhabi between the Adelaide Crows and the Collingwood Magpies. It was one of few official NAB Cup matches played outside of Australia and the game attracted a sell-out crowd of 6,102 using a makeshift field and grandstand and was televised free-to-air in Australia. The curtain raiser for the AFL match was played between the Dubai Dingos and Dubai Heat.

The Abu Dhabi Falcons and Dubai Dragons were formed in 2008 as the UAE's third and fourth clubs.

== Middle Eastern performance at International Cup ==
Flag	Nation	Rep team	2002	2005	2008	2011
(Israel) (Palestine)	Israel-Palestinian Territories	Peres Team for Peace	-	-	13th	3rd*

- * Competed in Division 2

== See also ==
- AFL Commission
- AFL Asia
- AFL Europe
- List of Australian rules football leagues outside Australia
