= Vivian Silver Impact Award =

Award for Israeli-Palestinian peace collaboration

- Awarded for: The award is granted to an Arab woman and an Israeli woman who embody the values and actions of the late Canadian-Israeli Vivian Silver.
- Sponsored by: New Israel Fund
- First award: 2024
- Winners: First year winners: Dr. Rula Hardal; May Pundak

The Vivian Silver Impact Award is presented annually to an Arab woman and Israeli woman (Note: In 2025, the award was changed to Israeli and Arab people who assist women, regardless of if the participants are men or women.) who embody the values and actions of the Canadian-Israeli peace activist Vivian Silver (1949-2023). The award was created by the family of Vivian Silver and launched and coordinated with the assistance of the New Israel Fund. The award is 55,000 NIS (New Israeli Shekel), which is equivalent to about 15,000 U.S. dollars, which will be given each year.

== Criteria for the award ==
The award was originally granted to an Arab woman and an Israeli woman who embody the values and actions of Vivian Silver in terms of the following:

- Building Arab-Jewish partnership in Israel.
- Establishing peace between Israel and Palestine.
- Advancing women to decision-making.
- Advancing women in leadership positions.

== Vivian Silver ==
Vivian Silver was born in Winnipeg, Manitoba, Canada and was a renowned Canadian-Israeli peace activist. In collaboration with Palestinian peace activist and community organizer Amal Elsana Alh’ joojj, Vivian and Amal established AJEEC—the Arab-Jewish Center for Equality, Empowerment, and Cooperation in 2000. Silver was also co-founder of the Israeli grassroots peace movement Women Wage Peace. The partnership empowered Bedouin women in the Israeli region to access good paying jobs acceptable to their traditional communities.

The Arab-Jewish Center for Equality, Empowerment, and Cooperation (AJEEC) describes the efforts of Silver as:

For more than five decades, Vivian Silver dedicated her efforts and passion to bringing people together in dignity, cooperation, and mutual respect. With a keen eye and an open heart, she fostered equality – between women and men, between Arabs and Jews – in Israeli society, and actively strived for peace in the region.

On October 7, 2023, she saw that her community, Kibbutz Be’eri, a kibbutz or collective settlement in southern Israel, was under attack by Hamas terrorists. She entered the safe room in her house and did a radio interview by phone with the nationwide Israeli radio network Galei Zahal. She stated to the radio broadcast that the present attack by Hamas on her community was why there was an urgent need for a peace deal. Her home was burned down by the terrorists. Although she was originally thought to have been kidnapped, it was later discovered that she had been killed by Hamas terrorist during the October 7 attacks.

== Award recipients ==
In 2024, the first recipients of the award, from out of more than one hundred candidates, were Dr. Rula Hardal and May Pundak, the co-directors of the A Land for All, an Israeli-Palestinian peace movement, for their dedication to the promotion of two sovereign states, Israel and Palestine, that will work in "together to ensure democracy and security for both peoples".

In 2025, the recipients were Dror Rubin and Ghadir Hani who had, while collecting food and supplies for those who recently displaced from the northern and southern border of Israel, collected the life stories of displaced women as well.
