= May Pundak =

Israeli human rights attorney and activist

- מאי פונדק
- Born: 1985 (age 40–41)
- Education: A bachelor’s and master’s degrees in law
- Alma mater: Mandel School for Educational Leadership
- Occupation: Human rights attorney
- Title: Co-director of A Land for All
- Father: Ron Pundak
- Relatives: Herbert Pundik (grandfather)
- Awards: Vivian Silver Impact Award

May Pundak (Hebrew: מאי פונדק; born 1985) is an Israeli human rights attorney and co-director of the Israeli-Palestinian peace movement A Land for All.

== Activism ==
In April 2024, she was in the podcast of Start Making Sense, the flagship weekly podcast of the magazine The Nation, where she discusses the application of the Two State Solution for Israel and Palestine as more a federation like that of the European Union. Later that same year (2024), it was announced that she would receive the Vivian Silver Impact Award.

== Early life and education ==
May Pundak was born in 1985 and is the daughter of Tula Pundak and historian and journalist Ron Pundak, one of the architects of the Oslo Accord, the 1993-1995 Israeli-Palestinian peace agreements. She is the granddaughter of Herbert Pundik, a Danish-Israeli journalist and author. Pundak has a bachelor’s and master’s degrees in law, and is a graduate of the Mandel School for Educational Leadership in Jerusalem, Israel.

== Awards and accolades ==
In November 2024, it was announced that she and her fellow co-director Dr. Rula Hardal would receive The Vivian Silver Impact Award. The award is named after Canadian-Israeli peace activist Vivian Silver, who was killed by Hamas militants during the October 7 attacks in 2023. The award is the joint initiative of Vivian Silver's friends and family and the New Israel Fund. The annual award recognizes the valuable contributions of Jewish and Palestinian women who are working to carry on legacy of Vivian Silver in terms of peace, partnership, and female leadership. The award judges said of Pundak:

Her leadership has offered a beacon of hope during the profoundly challenging days following October 7. May's deep empathy for both Palestinians and Israelis has enabled her to navigate these dark times with a compassionate and unwavering commitment to peace.
