= Pundak =

Pundak, Pundik or Fundik (Hebrew: פונדק) is a Jewish surname that may refer to

- Herbert Pundik (or Nahum Pundak, 1927–2019), Danish journalist and author
- Jordan Pundik (born 1979), American musician and songwriter
- Ron Pundak (1955–2014), Israeli historian and journalist
- Yitzhak Pundak (1913–2017), Israeli general, diplomat and politician
