= Road to Recovery =

Israeli charity providing transportation for Palestinian patients

- דרך להחלמה
- Formation: 2010; 16 years ago
- Founder: Yuval Roth
- Type: Non-profit
- Headquarters: Israel
- Services: Transportation for medical care, fostering Israeli-Palestinian connections
- Volunteers: 2,000+
- Award: Victor J. Goldberg Prize for Peace (2019)

Road to Recovery (Hebrew: בדרך להחלמה, Derech Hachlama) is an Israeli charity that connects Israeli volunteers with Palestinians in need of transportation to doctor's appointments and other medical care within Israel. The group also assists in transporting Gazans to appointments in the West Bank.

Although the Palestinian Authority covers the cost of some medical appointments, they do not cover transportation costs. As of 2023, the group was serving about 2,700 Palestinian patients each year.

In addition to providing logistical assistance, the organization also serves to develop connections between individual Israelis and Palestinians. In some cases, volunteers and patients will also meet to spend time together in recreational settings, attend memorial services for patients who have died, or support the families of deceased patients.

Road to Recovery is affiliated with and receives funding from Project Rozana, an Australia-based non-profit founded in 2013 by Hadassah Australia.

== History ==
In 1993, founder Yuval Roth's brother was returning house from reserve duty when he and a fellow soldier were kidnapped and killed by Hamas militants. A few years later, Roth joined The Parents Circle-Families Forum, a group of Israelis and Palestinians who have lost family in the Israeli-Palestinian conflict. In 2006, a Palestinian member of the forum asked for Roth's help in transporting an ill family member to Rambam Hospital in Haifa. Roth agreed and began recruiting some of his friends to help as well.

After receiving a donation from Leonard Cohen, Roth was encouraged to turn his loose collective of volunteers into a non-profit organization. Road to Recovery was subsequently founded in 2010 which Roth has said he sees as an act of reconciliation in his brother's honor.

In 2014, the organization had about 500 volunteers and was serving about 450 families. By 2014, Naim al Baida, a Palestinian construction worker, joined the non-profit to help coordinate transportation in the Central District and the West Bank.

As of 2014, the non-profit also organized five-day long summer retreats for child patients and their families at Jordan River Village.

In 2017, the organization developed a partnership with the West Bank-based non-profit Green Land Society for Health Development, which provides patient transportation within the West Bank. Another organization, Wheels of Hope, also provides transportation for patients within the West Bank.

In 2018, the group had nearly 2,000 volunteers, who made more than 20,000 patient trips in the year.

As of 2023, the group is headed by Yael Noy.

During the 7 October 2023 Hamas-led attack on Israel, six volunteers from Road to Recovery were killed in the attacks (including Vivian Silver and Hayim Katsman) and seven members (including Oded and Yochved Lifshitz) were taken hostage. Members of Road to Recovery continue with their operations in the West Bank driving approximately 140 people every day to Israeli hospitals. Operations to and from Gaza have been halted due to the Gaza war.

== Logistics ==
Volunteers, some of whom do not speak Arabic, have a variety of political ideologies and come from different parts of the country.

Israeli volunteer drivers are not able to cross with their cars into Palestinian Territories and vice versa, so patients are often picked up and dropped off at military checkpoints.

== Awards ==
In 2019, the organization received the Victor J. Goldberg Prize for Peace from the Institute of International Education.
