= Antony Green =

Australian psephologist and commentator (born 1960)

Antony Green AO FASSA
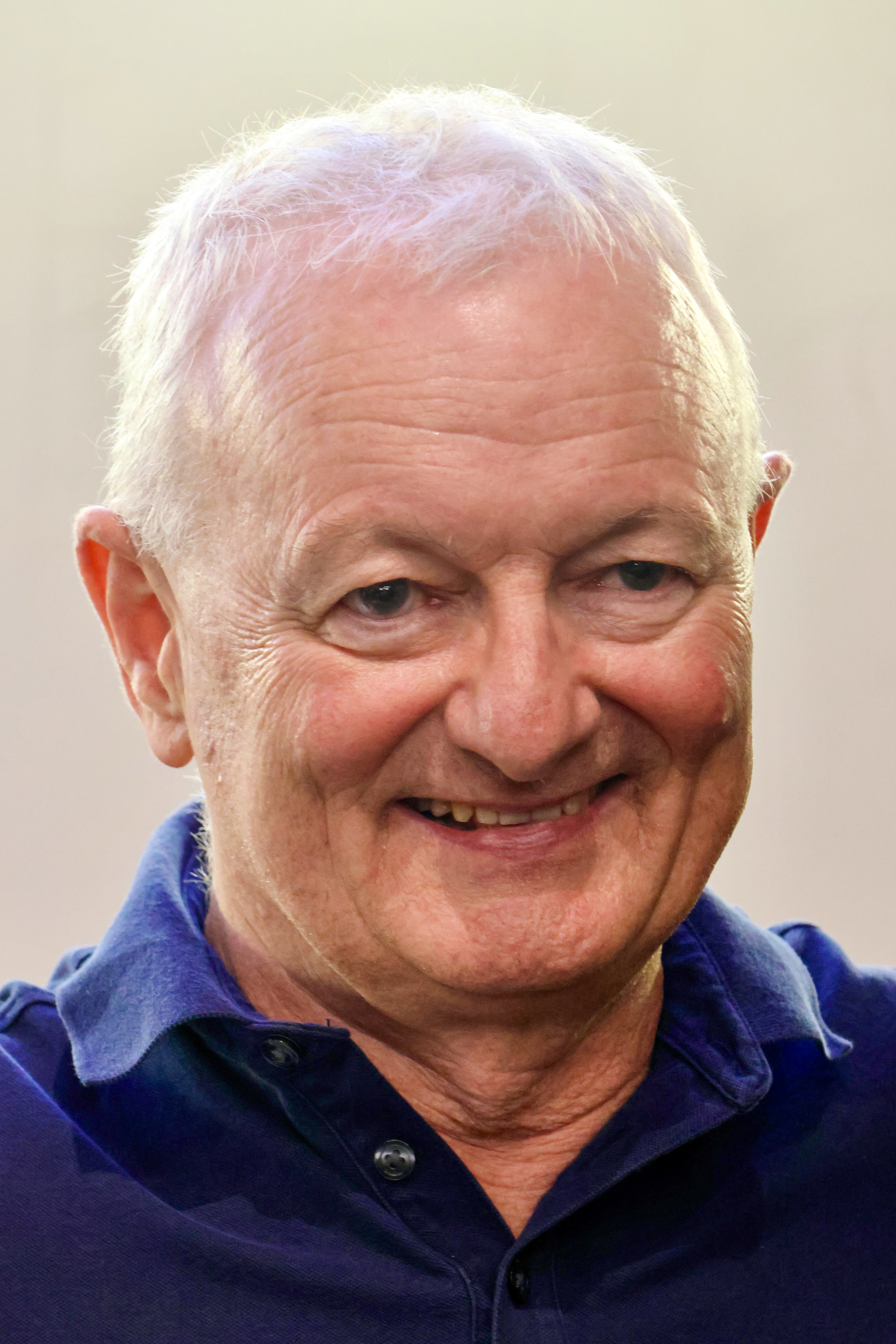
- Green at Adelaide University in 2026
- Born: Antony John Green; 2 March 1960 (age 66); Warrington, England
- Education: James Ruse Agricultural High School; University of Sydney (BSc, BEcon)
- Occupations: Psephologist; Data scientist
- Years active: 1986–present
- Known for: Chief Election Analyst for the Australian Broadcasting Corporation (1989–2025)
- Website: antonygreen.com.au

Antony John Green AO FASSA (born 2 March 1960) is an Australian psephologist, data scientist, journalist, and commentator. He was chief election analyst for the Australian Broadcasting Corporation (ABC) until his retirement from the role after the federal election in May 2025. He continues to work part-time for the ABC in an off-air capacity.

== Early years and education ==
Anthony Green was born in 1960 in Warrington, Lancashire, in northern England, to teen parents Ann and John Green. In 1964 the family migrated to Australia as Ten Pound Poms, staying first in a migrant hostel in Dundas, New South Wales. His father was an electrician by trade, and his mother worked as a seamstress.

Green grew up near Parramatta in Sydney, attended Oatlands Primary School in Oatlands, New South Wales and James Ruse Agricultural High School in Carlingford (Sydney), graduating in 1977.

Green graduated from the University of Sydney with a Bachelor of Science in mathematics and computing, and a Bachelor of Economics with honours in politics. Green worked initially as a data analyst in the computing industry and worked as a programmer for TAFE New South Wales.

== Career ==
=== Australian Broadcasting Corporation ===
In August 1989, Green joined the Australian Broadcasting Corporation. Green recalls he saw an ad for a position, on a six-month contract, as an ABC election researcher, and applied, along with 150 other applicants. His experience and his "slightly bubbly personality" helped him get the position. ABC producer Ian Carroll and journalist Kerry O’Brien recommended he stay on and he remained with the ABC for the following decades.

Green first appeared on the ABC's election-night television coverage in the 1991 New South Wales election, following with the federal election in 1993.

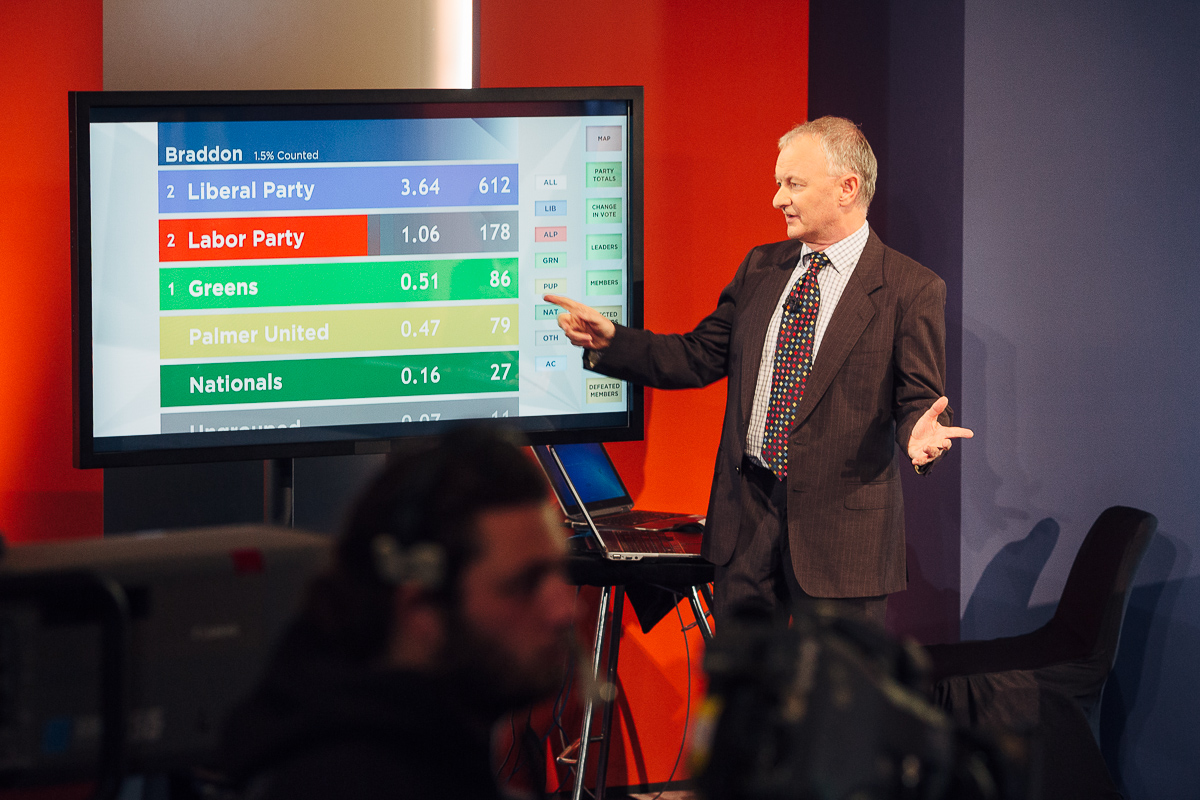
Green covering the 2014 Tasmanian state election for the ABC

As of 2025, Green had analysed over 90 Australian elections at the territory, state and federal level for the ABC, starting with the 1989 Queensland state election to the 2025 Australian federal election. He designed a computer system that he used to display and predict election results based on automated result feeds from Australia's electoral commissions. Green has also worked on elections from as far afield as Canada, New Zealand and the United Kingdom for the ABC.

External videos
- ABC election night broadcasts
- 2025 Australian federal election
- 2025 Western Australian state election
- 2023 New South Wales state election
- 2022 Australian federal election
- 2019 Australian federal election

As the ABC's chief election analyst, Green was responsible for the content of its election website. He also has editorial responsibility for its data analysis and for their election-night results service. He is considered "the face of election night coverage".

In time for the 2013 federal election campaign, Green helped introduce the voter engagement tool Vote Compass to the ABC website. It enables voters to gauge how their views align with candidates based on parties' statements on issues and also provides Green and other analysts a dataset larger than traditional opinion polls. Green also writes a comprehensive blog on electoral matters.

Green has said that he tends not to do campaign commentary and that he "prefer[red] to go into an election night with no preconceived view on the outcome and to just concentrate on understanding the data as it comes in..."

In a 2015 interview, he explained that some of the work in preparation for his election night coverage could start years earlier—including building up the database with candidates, polling places, and past results, and calculating the impact of redistributions. He also recounted the realisation of his recurring nightmare of the power outage during the on air coverage of the 2010 Victorian state election.

=== Retirement from television ===
"Antony's role has been fundamental. Australians over the years have learned to trust him, and that is pretty important in a democracy."

— Kevin Rudd, ABC News, 3 May 2025.

In February 2025, Green announced he would retire from broadcasting following the federal election later that year. Stating that he would be 68 by the time the next federal election would be expected, Green said he did not feel "as sharp and quick as I was", and that he would prefer to retire than stay "too long". In March 2025, he covered the 2025 Western Australian state election, which was his final state election, with his final coverage overall being for the federal election on 3 May 2025. Green has stated that he will stay on at the ABC "for a couple [more] years", albeit in a behind-the-scenes capacity, working on data systems and other election-related projects.

"There is no-one broadcasting on an election night that has their hands on the data, their understanding of the data at the level that Antony has had, for sure."

— Malcolm Turnbull, ABC News, 3 May 2025.

When Green retired from on-screen appearances in May 2025, the ABC released a video of former and current Australian Prime Ministers John Howard, Kevin Rudd, Julia Gillard, Tony Abbott, Malcolm Turnbull, Scott Morrison, and Anthony Albanese reminiscing about Green's commentary on their respective election nights, and wishing him well in retirement.

=== Writing and other activities ===
In addition to analysing and commenting on elections for the ABC, Green has written election analysis for third-party media outlets such as The Sydney Morning Herald and Crikey.

He has appeared before the Joint Standing Committee on Electoral Matters of the Australian Parliament urging reform of the ticket voting system used in Australian Senate elections. Green has also written papers for the Parliament of New South Wales and the Parliament of Victoria.

== Honours and awards ==
=== Honorary degrees ===
In 2014, the University of Sydney recognised Green with an Honorary Doctor of Letters. This was followed in 2015 by appointment as an adjunct professor in Sydney University's Department of Government and International Relations, recognising Green's work in the study of elections.

"Green's commitment to the study of elections has an intellectual depth beyond that of any other media commentator on elections, past or present. His appetite for elections is remarkable, as is the energy he puts into analysing and evaluating results the better to understand the results. His ABC blog is replete with detailed examinations of Australian elections, territory, state, and federal, including by-elections. It runs to hundreds of pages, enough for several monographs. This wealth of material is often used by students to learn about elections."

— University of Sydney, Honorary Doctor of Letters Conferring ceremony, 7 November 2014

=== National honours ===
In the Australian 2017 Queen's Birthday Honours List, Green was appointed an Officer of the Order of Australia (AO), "for distinguished service to the broadcast media as an analyst and commentator for state and federal elections, and to the community as a key interpreter of Australian democracy".

Green was elected an Honorary Fellow of the Academy of the Social Sciences in Australia in 2025.

== Personal life ==
Green is an avid cyclist, he is a member of the Dulwich Hill Cycling Club in Sydney, and takes long-distance biking trips mostly in Europe and Australia. He is also an ambassador for the Sydney Swans football club in the AFL.

== In popular culture ==
Green's contribution to political analysis was celebrated in the song "Antony Green" in the musical Keating!, where he was represented as an animated character.

== Publications ==
=== Research ===
- Green, Antony (2026); NSW Legislative Council election 2023; NSW Parliamentary Research Service Research Paper No. 2006-05; ISSN 2653-8318
- Green, Antony (2025); Western Australian State Election 2025 Analysis of Results; Western Australian Parliamentary Library Election Paper Series No. 1/2025; ISBN 978-0-6486381-5-5
- Green, Antony (2023); 2023 New South Wales election: Analysis of results; NSW Parliamentary Research Service Research Paper No. 2023-11; ISSN 2653-8318
- Green, Antony (2023); Prospects for the 2023 New South Wales Legislative Assembly Election; NSW Parliamentary Research Service Background Paper No. 01/2023; ISSN 1325-4456
- Green, Antony (2022); New South Wales Legislative Council Election 2019; NSW Parliamentary Research Service Background Paper No 04/2022; ISSN 1325-4456
- Green, Antony (2021); Western Australian State Election 2021 Analysis of Results; Western Australian Parliamentary Library Election Paper Series No. 1/2021; ISBN 978-0-9875969-4-9
- Green, Antony (2021); 2020/21 NSW Redistribution: Analysis of Final Electoral Boundaries; NSW Parliamentary Research Service Background Paper No 01/2021; ISSN 1325-4456
- Green, Antony (2018); NSW Legislative Council Election 2015; NSW Parliamentary Research Service Background Paper No 01/2018; ISSN 1325-4456
- Green, Antony (2017); 2017 Western Australian State Election Analysis of Results; Western Australian Parliamentary Library Election Paper Series No. 1/2025; ISBN 978-0-9875969-9-4
- Green, Antony (2015); 2015 New South Wales Election: Analysis of Results; NSW Parliamentary Research Service Background Paper No 1/2015; ISSN 1325-4456; ISBN 978-0-7313-1937-4
- Green, Antony (2013); 2013 Western Australian State Election Analysis of Results; Western Australian Parliamentary Library Election Paper Series No. 1/2013
- Green, Antony (2013); 2013 New South Wales Redistribution: Analysis of Final Electoral Boundaries; NSW Parliamentary Research Service Background Paper No 02/2013; ISSN 1325-4456; ISBN 978-0-7313-1909-1
- Green, Antony (2011); 2011 New South Wales Election: Analysis of Results; NSW Parliamentary Research Service Background Paper No 3/2011; ISSN 1325-4456; ISBN 978-0-7313-1882-7
- Green, Antony (2009); New South Wales Legislative Council Elections 2007; NSW Parliamentary Research Service Background Paper No 01/09; ISSN 1325-5142; ISBN 978-0-7313-1850-6
- Green, Antony (2009); 2008 Western Australian State Election Analysis of Results; Western Australian Parliamentary Library Election Paper Series No. 1/2009; ISBN 978-1-921243-84-4
- Green, Antony (2008); 2007 New South Wales Election: Final Analysis; NSW Parliamentary Research Service Background Paper No 1/08; ISSN 1325-5142
- Green, Antony (2006); Western Australian State Election 2005; Western Australian Parliamentary Library Election Paper Series No. 2/2005; ISBN 978-1-920886-66-0
- Green, Antony (2005); New South Wales By-elections, 1965 - 2005; NSW Parliamentary Research Service Background Paper No 3/05; ISSN 1325-5142; ISBN 978-0-7313-1786-8
- Green, Antony (2002); Implications of the 2001 Federal Election for the 2003 New South Wales Election; NSW Parliamentary Research Service Background Paper No 01/02; ISSN 1325-5142; ISBN 978-0-7313-1709-7
- Green, Antony (2001); Western Australian State Election 2001; Western Australian Parliamentary Library Election Paper Series No. 2/2001; ISBN 978-0-7307-6101-3
- Green, Antony (2001); Western Australian State Election 1996; Western Australian Parliamentary Library Election Paper Series No. 1/2001; ISBN 978-0-7307-6100-6
- Green, Antony (2000); New South Wales Legislative Council Elections 1999; NSW Parliamentary Research Service Background Paper No 2/2000; ISSN 1325-5142; ISBN 978-0-7313-1676-2
- Green, Antony (1999); New South Wales Elections 1999; NSW Parliamentary Research Service Background Paper No 4/99; ISSN 1325-5142; ISBN 978-0-7313-1655-7
- Green, Antony (1998); Implications of the 1998 Federal Election for the 1999 New South Wales Election; NSW Parliamentary Research Service Background Paper No 5/98; ISSN 1325-5142; ISBN 978-0-7313-1630-4
- Green, Antony (1995); NSW Elections 1995; NSW Parliamentary Research Service Background Paper No 1995/4; ISSN 1320-4521
- Green, Antony (1995); Electing the New South Wales Legislative Council 1978 to 1995: Past Results and Future Prospects; NSW Parliamentary Research Service Background Paper No 1995/2; ISSN 0817-3796
- Green, Antony (1994); NSW Elections 1984 to 1991: A Comparative Analysis; NSW Parliamentary Research Service Background Paper No 1994/2; ISSN 0817-3796

=== Published articles ===
- Green, Antony (2016); Plebiscites in Australian History, Australian Broadcasting Corporation, 30 September 2016
- Green, Antony (2016); How Long and Short Senate Terms are Allocated After a Double Dissolution, Australian Broadcasting Corporation, 25 April 2016
- Green, Antony (2016); Preference Flows at Federal Elections 1996-2013, Australian Broadcasting Corporation, 2 July 2016
- Green, Antony (2016); How Should You Vote in the Senate, Australian Broadcasting Corporation, 28 June 2016
- Green, Antony (2016); Electoral Law Ructions in the Queensland Parliament, Australian Broadcasting Corporation, 21 April 2016
- Green, Antony (2016); Senate Electoral Reform, Double Dissolutions and Section 64 of the Constitution, Australian Broadcasting Corporation, 15 March 2016
- Green, Antony (2016); Senate Reform - Why Bother Forcing Below-the-line Votes to be Full Preferential?, Australian Broadcasting Corporation, 25 February 2016
- Green, Antony (2016); Palmer United: The rise and demise of a vanity party, Australian Broadcasting Corporation, 20 January 2016
- Green, Antony (2016); NSW Electoral Law and the Problem of Randomly Elected Candidates, Australian Broadcasting Corporation, 13 January 2016
- Green, Antony (2015); Ballot Paper Instructions, iVote Preferences plus Nick Xenophon's Senate Proposal, Australian Broadcasting Corporation, 7 October 2015
- Green, Antony (2015); The Origin of Senate Group Ticket Voting, and it didn't come from the Major Parties, Australian Broadcasting Corporation, 23 September 2015
- Green, Antony (2015); By Accident Rather than Design - a Brief History of the Senate's Electoral System, Australian Broadcasting Corporation, 10 June 2015
- Green, Antony (2015); Should MPs and Senators be Allowed to Register Political Parties?, Australian Broadcasting Corporation, 30 April 2015
- Green, Antony (2015); Does Electronic Voting Increase the Donkey Vote?, Australian Broadcasting Corporation, 2 April 2015
- Green, Antony (2014); Antony Green 'Is It Time for a Fundamental Review of the Senate’s Electoral System?', Parliament of Australia Papers on Parliament No 62, October 2014
- Green, Antony (2014); How MMP Works, Australian Broadcasting Corporation, 20 September 2014
- Green, Antony (2014); Party Support at Scottish Elections, Australian Broadcasting Corporation, 9 September 2014
- Green, Antony (2014); NSW Parliament looks to stack Sydney City Council - again!, Australian Broadcasting Corporation, 5 September 2014
- Green, Antony (2014); Ricky Muir's Strange Path to the Senate, Australian Broadcasting Corporation, 7 August 2014
- Green, Antony (2014); How Senate Rotations are Re-established After a Double Dissolution, Australian Broadcasting Corporation, 30 June 2014
- Green, Antony (2014); Tasmania's Hare-Clark Electoral System, Australian Broadcasting Corporation, 17 January 2014
- Green, Antony (2014); How the Senate's new Electoral System Might Work - Lessons from NSW, Australian Broadcasting Corporation, 27 June 2014
- Green, Antony (2013); Reform Options for the South Australian Legislative Council, Australian Broadcasting Corporation, 30 October 2013
- Green, Antony (2013); Hand the power of preferences back to the people, Australian Broadcasting Corporation, 11 September 2013
- Green, Antony (2013); Senate voting threatens more than our eyesight, Australian Broadcasting Corporation, 29 August 2013
- Green, Antony (2012); Local Seats for Local People - Who Should be Allowed to Contest Elections, Australian Broadcasting Corporation, 22 February 2012
- Green, Antony (2012); Linear Voting at ACT Elections, Australian Broadcasting Corporation, 9 October 2012
- Green, Antony (2012); O'Farrell Government Changes the Rules on Electoral Redistributions; Australian Broadcasting Corporation, 23 October 2012
- Green, Antony (2012); The Greens versus Labor - Geographic and Educational Dimensions; Australian Broadcasting Corporation, 10 September 2012
- Green, Antony (2011); A Beginners Guide to Gerrymandering; Australian Broadcasting Corporation, 2 November 2011
- Green, Antony (2011); The Political Impact of Optional Preferential Voting; Australian Broadcasting Corporation, 19 October 2011
- Green, Antony (2011); NSW Automatic Enrolment and its Challenge for the Commonwealth; Australian Broadcasting Corporation, 16 July 2011
- Green, Antony (2011); Pauline Hanson and the NSW Legislative Council election; Australian Broadcasting Corporation, 9 March 2011

=== Parliamentary inquiry submissions ===
- Green, Antony (2024); Administration of the 2023 NSW State Election and Other Matters; Submission to the NSW Parliament's Joint Standing Committee on Electoral Matters, 22 February 2024
- Green, Antony (2020); Inquiry into the Electoral Commission of Queensland’s online publication of the preliminary and formal counts of the votes cast in the 2020 quadrennial local government election and the Bundamba and Currumbin state byelections held on 28 March 2020"; Submission to the Queensland Parliament's Legal Affairs and Community Safety Committee, 10 May 2020
- Green, Antony (2019); Administration of the 2019 State Election; Submission to the NSW Parliament's Electoral Matters Committee, 3 December 2019
- Green, Antony (2017); Comments on Informal Voting in Western Australia; Submission to the Community Development and Justice Standing Committee, 13 September 2017
- Green, Antony (2016); Inquiry into the Provisions of the Commonwealth Electoral Amendment Bill 2016; Submission to the Joint Standing Committee on Electoral Matters, 28 February 2016
- Green, Antony (2015); Inquiry into the 2015 NSW Election; Submission to the NSW Parliament's Joint Standing Committee on Electoral Matters, 24 August 2015
- Green, Antony (2011); Inquiry into the Conduct of the 2010 Election; Submission to the Joint Standing Committee on Electoral Matters, February 2011
- Green, Antony (2008); Informal Voting byJurisdiction; Submission to the Joint Standing Committee on Electoral Matters, 23 July 2008
- Green, Antony (2005); The Conduct of the 2004 Commonwealth Election; Submission to the Joint Standing Committee on Electoral Matters, 31 March 2005

== See also ==
- List of Australian federal elections
- List of Australian federal by-elections
- Referendums in Australia
