= Eliza Harvey (journalist) =

Australian journalist and producer

- Born: 1984 (age 41–42); Australia
- Education: University of Sydney, New South Wales
- Occupations: Journalist, producer & TV presenter
- Years active: 2003 – present
- Organization(s): Australian Broadcasting Corporation; Rozana
- Known for: Host of Weekend Breakfast
- Spouse: Adam Harvey
- Children: 2
- Parent(s): Geraldine Doogue; Tim Blue

Eliza Harvey (née Blue) (born 1984) is an Australian journalist, television producer, and presenter.

She is best known for hosting Weekend Breakfast on ABC TV, but was also the last executive producer of Q+A and The Drum, and is a journalist who has reported from Indonesia and the Middle East, also working as a communications advisor for the United Nations while in Lebanon.

Harvey is currently associate editor and series producer of Rampart News since early 2026.

== Early life and education ==
Eliza Harvey was born in 1984 as Eliza Blue to ABC presenter Geraldine Doogue and journalist Tim Blue. She graduated the University of Sydney (USYD) in Sydney, New South Wales, with a Bachelor of Arts degree, majoring in history and politics. While completing her degree at USYD she continued working as a producer on various programs at Sydney radio stations. She then worked for the Sydney bureau of Kyodo News while studying for a Master's degree in Political science.

== Career ==
Eliza Harvey began her career in journalism at ABC Radio National from 2003 as a producer on Radio National Breakfast. She first began working at ABC TV in 2007, assigned to Hobart, before moving in February 2008 to Karratha in the Pilbara region of Western Australia, reporting on the resources industry. Harvey then moved to East Perth to become a business reporter on all ABC News platforms.

From 2009 to the program's cancellation in March 2011, Harvey hosted Stateline Western Australia, succeeding Rebecca Carmody. When the Stateline format was incorporated into 7.30 in 2011, Harvey continued hosting 7.30 Western Australia until the end of 2011, being succeeded by Andrew O'Connor from early 2012. She became a Sydney-based New South Wales political reporter for ABC News from 2012.

In 2015, Harvey moved with her family to Indonesia as a freelance journalist living in Jakarta, returning to Australia in 2017. She relocated to Beirut, Lebanon in 2019 as a Senior Communications Advisor for the United Nations Deputy Special Coordinator of Lebanon, Philippe Lazzarini, reporting on the 17 October Revolution and ensuing Liquidity crisis. During this time Harvey also worked with non-governmental organisation aiding South Asian and Syrian refugees, additionally traveling regularly across Israel and Palestine.

In March 2020 she moved back to Sydney as a result of the COVID-19 pandemic, resuming her role as host of Weekend Breakfast on ABC News 24, which she presented back in 2014. In 2018 she collaborated with her mother, Geraldine Doogue in creating and presenting the Long Distance Call podcast, based on Harvey's phone calls with her mother while she was away from Sydney.

Harvey became a board member in March 2021 of Project Rozana, a non-profit humanitarian organisation aiming to connect Palestinians in the Gaza Strip and the West Bank with appropriate healthcare, Harvey is chair of the organisation's Communications and Media Committee.

She became a reporter for The Drum from August 2014 before becoming the executive producer of the program from December 2022 until its cancelation at the end of 2023, with Harvey becoming the executive producer of Q+A, a position she currently maintains.

== Personal life ==
Eliza Harvey is married to fellow ABC journalist and reporter Adam Harvey, son of Peter Harvey. They have two children together, a son, Sean born in 2014, and a daughter, Isla born in 2016. In July 2017, Harvey was one of many journalists who signed a Medium letter requesting the Walkley Awards to not cease the prize category for International Journalism, the prize was reintroduced in 2023. Harvey is a supporter of the Sydney Swans.
