= A Land for All (organization) =

Israeli-Palestinian peace movement

- Formation: 2012
- Co-CEOs: May Pundak; Dr. Rula Hardal
- Website: alandforall.org

A Land for All (Arabic: بلاد للجميع, Hebrew: ארץ לכולם; also known as Two States, One Homeland) is an Israeli-Palestinian political initiative comprising Israeli Jews, Palestinian citizens of Israel, and Palestinians, which proposes a two-state confederation as the solution to the Israeli–Palestinian conflict. This solution promotes the existence of two sovereign states in the Israeli and Palestinian territories, based on shared principles of equality, freedom and dignity.

The organization is a member of Alliance for Middle East Peace.

== History ==
The initiative was founded under a joint Israeli-Palestinian leadership in 2012. The organization was born out of a series of meetings between Meron Rappaport, an Israeli journalist, and Awni Al-Mahshni, a Palestinian activist. Palestinian and Israeli journalists, scholars and activists gradually joined these meetings to formulate a statement of shared principles for coexistence. Its co-CEOs are May Pundak, an Israeli Jew and daughter of Ron Pundak, and Dr. Rula Hardal, a Palestinian citizen of Israel.

The organization won the Outstanding Peace Support Award Luxembourg Peace Prize in 2021.

== Wider acknowledgment ==
Their proposal was presented at the 2025 UN High-Level Conference on "The Peaceful Settlement of the Question of Palestine and the Implementation of the Two-State Solution."

In November, 2025, their proposal was adopted by Standing Together, a social justice movement of Jewish and Palestinian citizens of Israel. In June 2026, Standing Together launched a new political party, Makom Lekulanu (Hebrew: מקום לכולנו, lit. "a place for us all"), which has been described as evoking the Hebrew name for A Land For All, Eretz Lekulam (Hebrew: ארץ לכולם).

== Proposal ==
Under A Land for All's proposal, Israel/Palestine would be a singular territorial unit, with two states (under the pre-1967 Green Line borders) forming a confederation. The movement's proposal is part of a larger shift towards promoting a partnership between Israelis and Palestinians, rather than a strict separation. The movement's key principles address many of the existing sources of tension in the long-standing conflict and provide guidelines for resolving them:

- The movement posits and acknowledges that both Israelis and Palestinians have a strong religious connection to the land as a whole, and should have access to the land. They propose each state would be sovereign and independent, but would be linked by an open border.
- The governmental systems in both states will be democratic. Palestinians residing in Israel would vote in Palestinian national elections and Israeli citizens residing in the future Palestinian state would vote in Israel. A number of institutions would be shared by both states for matters that equally affect both communities (such as water management, epidemic management, tourism, and finances). The two states will decide which matters will be handled jointly.
- Recognising the harm caused by the expulsion of Palestinians from their historical homeland, the future Palestinian state will have the sovereign right to grant Palestinian refugees the right of return while diaspora Jews would maintain the right to return to Israel. Under the group's proposal, Palestinian refugees could return to Palestine, and would gradually have an option to reside in Israel. Israeli settlers living in Palestine would remain citizens of Israel. Arab Israelis would be dual citizens of both states.
- Illegal Israeli settlers currently living in the occupied territories will become Israeli residents of Palestine, provided they accept and abide by Palestinian sovereign law. They will have the right to vote for local authorities, as will Palestinian citizens residing in Israel. However, the freedom of more Israelis to reside in Palestine will be implemented gradually to avoid overwhelming the Palestinian state with Israeli citizens. The plan emphasises the cessation of Israeli settlement expansion in the West Bank, recognizing the harm caused to the Palestinian public through land expropriation. There will be no Israeli military presence in the Palestinian state. Instead, both states will develop shared, effective, and competent security apparatuses.
- Jerusalem will be the shared capital of both states, and will be managed by international authorities and religious representatives.
- There will be full security responsibility within each country's sovereign territory, with a robust security partnership between the two states. This scheme will include independent security forces operating solely within their respective territories. Despite independent operations, both countries will engage in close cooperation on security, intelligence, and policing matters. While promoting free movement between Israel and Palestine, both countries reserve the right to deny entry to hostile individuals and conduct necessary border checks to ensure security without compromising the openness of borders. Both Israel and Palestine will commit to demilitarisation agreements, expressing their mutual commitment to security and safety for all citizens, regardless of ethnicity. Conflicts between the two states would be resolved either through a joint Israeli-Palestinian assembly or a joint human rights court. There would be a form of shared security institution, but each state would maintain its own security forces.
- Citizens of both states will have equal rights in accordance with the Universal Declaration of Human Rights. This principle is based on the need to address historical injustices, and acknowledge the Palestinian minority in Israel as an integral part of the Palestinian people. This includes addressing issues related to power dynamics, resource allocation, and access to land, planning, and development. There will be amendments to discriminatory laws and practices hindering equal participation by Palestinian citizens of Israel. This involves ensuring equal representation, revoking discriminatory laws, and promoting equitable resource allocation, land access, and legal resolutions for construction, including recognizing Bedouin communities in the Negev.

== See also ==
- Israeli–Palestinian peace process
