= Peter Harvey =

Australian journalist and broadcaster (1944–2013)

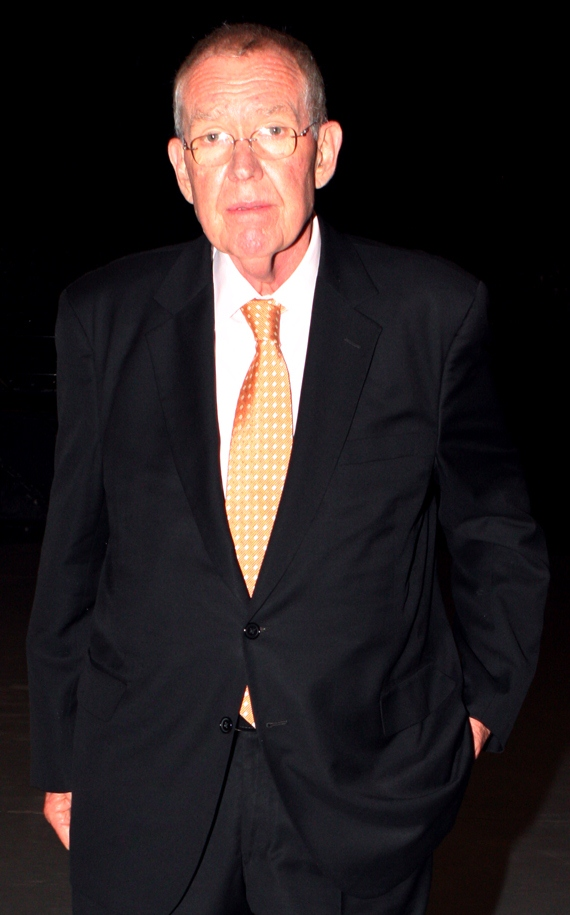
- Harvey in 2012
- Born: Peter Michael St Clair Harvey; 16 September 1944; Bellevue Hill, Sydney, Australia
- Died: 2 March 2013 (aged 68); St Leonards, Sydney, New South Wales, Australia
- Occupation: Television journalist
- Years active: 1960–2013
- Notable credit(s): 60 Minutes; The Guardian; The Daily Telegraph
- Spouse: Anne
- Children: 2

Peter Michael St Clair Harvey (16 September 1944 – 2 March 2013) was an Australian journalist and broadcaster. Harvey was a long-serving correspondent and contributor with the Nine Network from 1975 to 2013.

== Career ==
Harvey studied his journalism cadetship with the Sydney newspaper The Daily Telegraph and won a Walkley Award in 1964. He worked at radio stations 2UE and 2GB before moving to London and working for BBC Radio. He then went on to The Guardian (where he received the British Reporter of the Year Award for a series of articles about the sale of confidential information) and the American Newsweek magazine as a reporter in Vietnam during the Vietnam War.

Harvey changed to television when he joined the Nine Network in 1975 and served as its news director in the network's Canberra bureau for many years. One of his first major stories was the dismissal of Prime Minister Gough Whitlam in November 1975.

It was through this and through his political coverage on Nine’s nightly news bulletins that his sign-off line "Peter Harvey, Canberra", became well known and even parodied by comedy shows like the Australian Full Frontal and The Late Show.

Harvey also reported for the network from numerous international trips by Australian prime ministers and was based in Saudi Arabia in 1990 with American forces at the commencement of the first Gulf War. He transferred from Canberra to the network's Sydney headquarters in February 1997. In later years he contributed to Today and 60 Minutes, where he presented a weekly viewers' feedback segment.

Harvey was awarded a Centenary Medal in 2001, for service to Australian society in journalism. He was posthumously inducted into the Logie Hall of Fame on 27 April 2014.

== Illness and death ==
On 11 October 2012, Harvey announced that he had been diagnosed with pancreatic cancer. He stated that he had found out about his illness three weeks earlier when he was holidaying in Venice with his wife.

On 2 March 2013, Harvey died at North Shore Private Hospital in Sydney at the age of 68.

== Personal life ==
Harvey was born and raised in Bellevue Hill near Bondi in Sydney. He was married to Anne and had two children, Claire and Adam, who both went into careers in journalism. Claire is deputy editor of The Sunday Telegraph newspaper and Adam is a reporter for the Australian Broadcasting Corporation in Sydney. Adam's wife Eliza is a daughter of journalist Geraldine Doogue, from her first marriage with Tim Blue.

In a 2008 interview, Harvey stated, "I believe very strongly in God and Jesus Christ, but not so much on organised religion. I had a boarding school knock that out of me."
