= Stateline (TV program) =

Australian news brand

- Genre: News, current affairs
- Presented by: Quentin Dempster (NSW); Josie Taylor (VIC); Jessica van Vonderen (QLD); Ian Henschke (SA); Eliza Blue (WA); Laetitia Lemke (NT); Airlie Ward (TAS); Chris Kimball (ACT)
- Country of origin: Australia

Original release
- Network: ABC1; ABC News 24 (2010); ABC iview
- Release: 16 February 1996 – 4 March 2011
- Release: 1 January 2024 – July 2026

Related
- ABC News; 7.30

Stateline is a brand previously used by the Australian Broadcasting Corporation for in-depth local and state-based news stories and interviews. Some of the stories were featured on a monthly program called Stateline, which aired on the ABC News Channel. The last host of Stateline was ABC News Canberra anchor Greg Jennett.

Stateline was previously a weekly, Friday night television current affairs program. It provided analysis of state and municipal politics as well as insight into state and regional issues in a current affairs journalistic style. The program was known for its interviews with politicians, and for its coverage of important regional issues.

The program premiered on 16 February 1996 at 6 pm. It moved to 7:30 pm in February 2001, which resulted in The 7.30 Report being removed from Fridays.

The ABC announced in December 2010 that the state-based current affairs program Stateline would be folded into a new 7.30 brand from March 2011. The change saw 7.30 extended to five nights a week, although Friday editions were to be presented locally and focus on state affairs. The Friday state-based editions of 7.30 were eventually axed in December 2014.

The brand continued to be used by the ABC in various forms, until being retired in July 2026.

== Format ==
It is broadcast on ABC TV, ABC News and ABC iview on Sundays during the state-based news bulletins, with eight separate state and territory specific editions. It was also broadcast on the new digital channel ABC2 after its launch in March 2005.

With the launch of ABC News 24 in 2010, each local version of Stateline was also broadcast nationally on the channel over the weekend.

Since the conclusion of the standalone Stateline program, the brand name continued to be used by the ABC, with local presenters of state news bulletins anchoring episodes of Stateline. The brand was retired in July 2026.

Former presenters of Stateline until 2011 include:

| State/Territory | Presenter |
|---|---|
| New South Wales | Quentin Dempster |
| Victoria | Josie Taylor |
| Queensland | Jessica van Vonderen |
| Western Australia | Eliza Blue |
| South Australia | Ian Henschke |
| Tasmania | Airlie Ward |
| Australian Capital Territory | Chris Kimball |
| Northern Territory | Laetitia Lemke |
