= AFL Peace Team =

AFL Peace Team's official logo

The AFL Peace Team was a project created by Tanya Oziel, and curated by Peres Center for Peace and Innovation in Israel together with its Palestinian counterpart, the Al Quds Association for Democracy and Dialogue, based in the Palestinian Territories, which aimed to utilise the game Australian rules football as an instrument in bridging the gap between Israelis and Palestinians, paving the way to peaceful co-existence.

== History ==
The project was created in 2008 and ended in late 2011. It was the most high-profile Middle East peace activity in Australia with strong resonance for Australian multicultural activity and diversity initiatives. The idea to utilise a sport that had no history in the region, which would allow a neutral ground upon which Israelis and Palestinians would be able to build together, acting as partners, was conceived by a Sydney businesswoman, Tanya Oziel, in early 2007. Together with her long-time business partner, Johnny Weiss, they opened the Australian Chapter of (Shimon) Peres Center for Peace, and began to work on the idea.

== Team symbols ==
Due to a charged political situation in the region the usage of Israeli and Palestinian flags presented a challenge. And, thus, eventually a neutral symbol of peace was chosen. Team's logo is round in shape and features a classic peace symbol: a white dove carrying an olive branch over a golden background.

== International participation ==
Peace Team made their debut at the 2008 AFL International Cup in Melbourne, a triennial event that takes place in Australia. 13 Israelis and 13 Palestinians competed as a united Peace Team, making Australian sporting history.

The Team has returned for the next, and its final, AFL International Cup in 2011.

== Peace Team I ==
Peace Team I was the team that was established just 6 month prior to the 2008 AFL International Cup took place in Melbourne. This pilot was put together by Tanya Oziel who managed to fundraise sufficient funds from corporate Australia, including Deloitte, Hyundai, NAB and Visy. She also managed to secure support from various influential Australians including AFL talent manager Kevin Sheehan, a retired Australian rules footballer Robert DiPierdomenico, a respected Melbourne barrister Henry Jolson, AFL legend Ron Barassi.

Peace Team I was captained by Uri and Kamal Abu Altom. In the competition the team faced national teams of the Great Britain, Papua New Guinea, Nauru, China and Finland.

Peace Team lost its first three games in a spectacular way. Great Britain Bulldogs crushed the Peace Team 20.15(135) to 1.2(8). Papua New Guinea Mosquitos continued devastation beating Peres Team of Peace 20.20(140) to 1.2(8), and Nauru Chiefs finished Round 3 with an absolute domination of 28.9(177) to Peace Team's 1.1(7).

However, the luck finally changed in final rounds when Peace Team met with other developing nations. Peres Team for Peace was able to secure their first win against China Red Demons 5.7(37) to 4.4(28). In the final match of the tournament Peace Team I got to experience a crushing victory against Finland Icebreakers beating them 14.5(89) to 2.2(14) finishing the International Cup on a high note.

== Peace Team II ==
In 2011 Tanya Oziel decided to repeat the Peace Team project success to prove that the Peace Team 2008 wasn't a one-off with a hope to build an ongoing program.

Due to a worsening political situation in the region post 2008 AFL International Cup and funding issues regular training wasn't possible for the Peace Team I, and so the project was on hiatus.

In early 2011 once Tanya managed to secure funding, the work on the Peace II resumed.

A new squad was formed and regular training began under the continuing guidance of the head coach Robert DiPierdomenico.

Peace Team II was co-captained by Avi Benvenisty and Kamal Abu Altom.

In 2011 AFL International Cup the Peace Team was placed into the Group 6 with Canada and the United States. After losing both games 3.6(24) to 0.0(0) to Canada and 12.7(79) to 0.0(0) to United States, Peace Team II advanced to Division 2 where they were placed in the same pool with China and Fiji. Here Peace Team II was defeated by Fiji 11.19(85) to 4.2(26), but were victorious against China 12.18(90) to 1.1(7).

== In media and popular culture ==
Peace Team found many supporters in Australia, including AFL Carlton Football Club.

The project was featured in multiple documentary films including "Tackling Peace" by Marc Radomsky and "The essence of the game" by Rob Dickson.

== Legacy ==
The AFL Peace Team project became the foundation of Australian rules football movement in Israel. Multiple players from the project went on to establish the Jerusalem Peace Lions football club in May 2015, with few of the players consequently becoming a part of the Tel Aviv Cheetahs football club.
