= Aix Group =

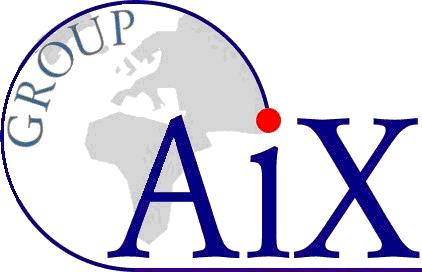
- Founded: 2002
- Founder: Gilbert Benhayoun, Arie Arnon, Saeb Bamya
- Type: NGO
- Purpose: Economic dimensions of the Two-state solution to the Israeli–Palestinian conflict
- Location: Aix-Marseille University, Israel, Palestine
- Region served: Israel, Palestinian Territories, Arab World
- Method: Publishing of economic research, policy advocacy
- Key people: Ron Pundak, Samir Hazboun
- Website: www.aixgroup.org

Aix Group is a French-Israeli-Palestinian-international economic study team hosted by the Université Aix-Marseille (AMU) in the region of Provence-Alpes-Côte d'Azur in the South of France in coordination with the DATA Center for Studies and Research in the Palestinian Authority, the Harry S. Truman Institute for the Advancement of Peace in Jerusalem and, until 2015, the Peres Center for Peace in Israel and. Their aim is to inform policy makers of the economic costs of the Israeli–Palestinian conflict, as well as to provide policy makers with economic solutions towards a two-state solution, and detail how each could benefit by improving economic cooperation.

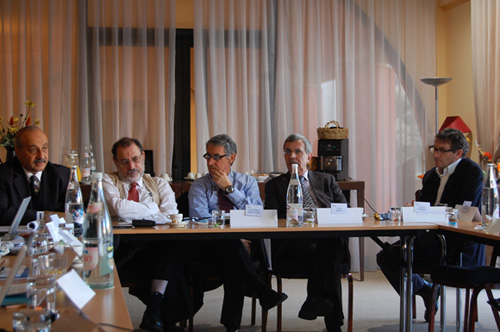
Meeting of the Aix Group steering committee. From left to right: Dr. Samir Hazboun, Prof. Arie Arnon, Prof. Gilbert Benhayoun, Mr. Saeb Bamya, Dr. Ron Pundak.

== Previous publications ==
Since its formation in 2002 the Aix Group published a series of position papers on economic issues related to the Israeli-Palestinian conflict. The aim of the position papers is to provide policy makers with 'ready-to-use' economic policies should a final status agreement between Israel and the Palestinians be concluded. To date the Aix Group has published four position papers.

=== Economic Road Map: An Israeli-Palestinian Perspective on Permanent Status (2004) ===
Outlines recommendations for future long-term economic relations between Israel and Palestine in the following policy fields: trade, labour, monetary, fiscal and investment.

=== Israel and Palestine: Between Disengagement and the Economic Road Map (2005) ===
Analyzes the risks and benefits of Israel's unilateral disengagement plan from Gaza and the West Bank, implemented by Israel in the summer of 2005. Potential outcomes arising from the withdrawal are discussed, as well as its effects on the survival of the Palestinian economy.

=== Economic Dimensions of a Two-State Agreement between Israel and Palestine (2007) ===
Examination of four key economic issues that need addressing for advancing the two-state solution.

1. Economic Cooperation in Jerusalem
2. Economic Aspects of the Palestinian Refugee Issue
3. Cooperation in Infrastructure Issues
4. Topics of contemporary importance (i.e. Palestinian labour, development of the Jordan Valley and transitional trade agreements)

=== Economic Dimensions of a Two-State Solution Agreement Between Israel and Palestine, Vol II: Supplementary Papers (2010) ===
Further examination of five important economic issues with respect to peace negotiations between Israelis and Palestinians

1. The comparative political-economic viability of a two-state solution versus a one-state solution
2. Economic Aspects of the Palestinian Refugee Issue
3. The territorial link between Gaza and the West Bank
4. Economic Development of the Jordan Valley
5. The Union for the Mediterranean (EU-MED)

== Territorial link between Gaza and the West Bank ==
Israelis and Palestinians have agreed in principle to the creation of a link between the West Bank and the Gaza Strip, referred to as a "permanent safe passage" by Bill Clinton in the 2000 Clinton Parameters.

The Aix Group has offered proposals on the design and cost of a territorial link between the Gaza Strip and the West Bank. They recommended the construction of a joint motorway and rail link between the Karni Crossing in the Gaza Strip and El Majed Crossing on the West Bank. They estimate the cost of the project up to $1 billion, to be financed by the World Bank as a long term loan to Palestine.

== Palestinian refugees ==
One of the Aix Group’s ongoing issues relates to the design of an economic agreement concerning the Palestinian refugees. They estimate that a fair package of resettlement or rehabilitation for the 4.5 million registered refugees would run to between $55 billion and $85 billion, the cost of which would be divided between the UN and the Israeli and Palestinian governments.

== Economic consequences of the ongoing Israeli–Palestinian conflict ==
In 2011, in the run-up to the Palestinian bid for statehood at the United Nations the Aix Group published a research paper on the current state of the Palestinian economy and the possible economic outcomes should the Palestinian statehood bid succeed or fail ('"September" as a Crossroads'). The research was conducted jointly by Israeli economists Yitshak Gal and Arie Arnon along with Palestinian economists Shawqi Makhtoub and Saeb Bamya.

Although the Palestinian economy has shown robust levels of growth since the end of the Second Intifada the report’s findings highlight the inherent weaknesses of the Palestinian economy and how the current political and economic status quo between Israel and the Palestinians remains unsustainable. According to the researchers, a failure to resume peace negotiations based on the principle of a two-state solution may result in the dangerous transformation of the West Bank into a Gaza-style scenario.

To date the position paper has been widely commented upon, both on national Israeli television and in a number of Israeli and Palestinian financial publications.

== Links to publications ==
- Economic Road Map: An Israeli-Palestinian Perspective on Permanent Status (2004)
- Israel and Palestine: Between Disengagement and the Economic Road Map (2005)
- Economic Dimensions of a Two-State Agreement Between Israel and Palestine (2007)
- Economic Dimensions of a Two-State Agreement Between Israel and Palestine, Vol II: Supplementary Papers (2010)
- "September" as a Crossroads: An Opportunity for a Two-State Solution and the Risks of the Status Quo and Escalation (2011)
