= Geraldine Doogue =

Australian journalist and radio/television presenter

Geraldine Doogue AO
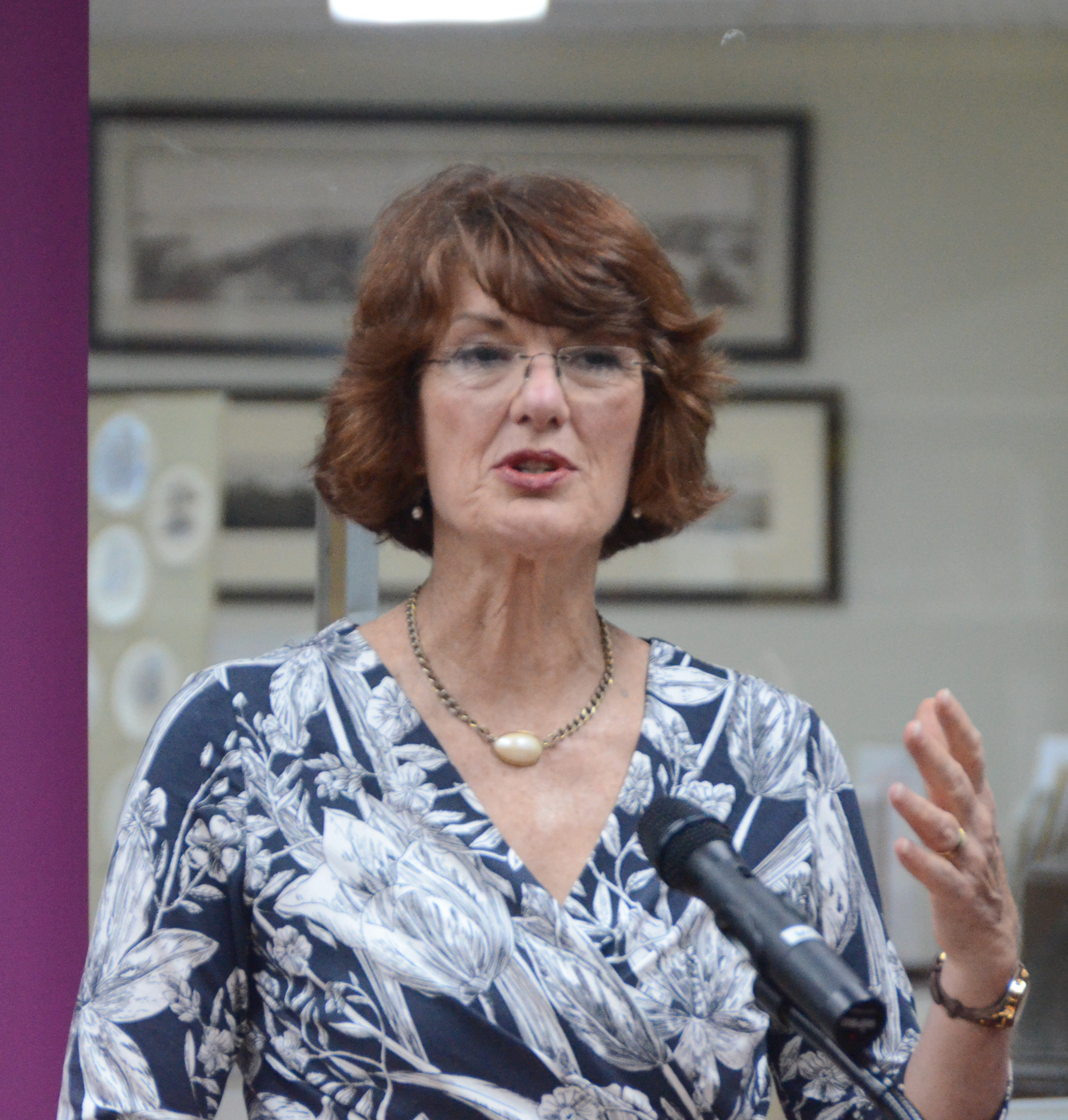
- Geraldine Doogue in 2014
- Born: 29 April 1952 (age 74); Subiaco, Western Australia
- Education: University of Western Australia
- Occupations: Journalist, radio presenter, television presenter
- Years active: 1985–present
- Employer: Australian Broadcasting Corporation
- Known for: Global Roaming
- Television: Compass
- Spouses: Tim Blue (divorced) Ian Carroll (m. 1987; died 2011)
- Children: 4
- Website: Geraldine Doogue; Presenter profile ABC

Geraldine Frances Doogue AO (/duːɡ/) (born 29 April 1952) is an Australian journalist and radio and television presenter, known for her work with the Australian Broadcasting Corporation (ABC). Since January 2024, she has been co-host of Radio National's Global Roaming current affairs programme.

== Career ==
After graduating from the University of Western Australia with a Bachelor of Arts degree, Doogue intended to train as a school teacher, but instead decided to apply for a cadetship at The West Australian newspaper. She later worked for The Australian and spent several years in the United Kingdom as London correspondent for News Limited's Australian newspapers. The Australian Broadcasting Corporation executives were so impressed with Doogue's on-air presence during an interview with the Four Corners programme, that she was offered a hosting role on Nationwide. In 1985 she and Richard Morecroft co-hosted The National, the ABC's short-lived experiment with a nationwide hour-long nightly news service, combining news and current affairs, with Max Walsh and Richard Carleton as chief reporters.

She worked at TEN-10 Sydney from 1988 to 1989 as co-presenter on Eyewitness News with Steve Liebmann and on commercial radio with 2UE, then returned to the ABC in 1990.

In 1990 Doogue hosted the Ethnic Business Awards, which is a national business award highlighting migrant and Indigenous excellence in business. She went on to host these awards again in 1995, 1999, 2002, and 2004.

Doogue was the host of Radio National's Life Matters programme for 11 years from its inception in 1992. She received a United Nations Association of Australia Media Peace Award and two Penguin Awards for her role in ABC TV's coverage of the Gulf War. She was the host of Compass on ABC TV from 1998 to 2017. Starting in 2005, she was a former host of the 90 minute Saturday Extra programme (as well as its truncated 60 minute version Extra) on Radio National until new host Nick Bryant was appointed in 2024. She returned to Compass for an episode in which she interviews the Governor-General Sam Mostyn after one year in the role.

In November 2018, Doogue was inducted into the Australian Media Hall of Fame.

Starting in January 2024, she and Hamish Macdonald became co-presenters of Global Roaming, a new half-hour current affairs programme from Radio National which every week does an in-depth examination of a single issue of national or international importance.

== Personal life ==
Doogue was first married (fl. 1982) to publicist Tim Blue and then to ABC executive Ian Carroll who died from pancreatic cancer on 19 August 2011. With Carroll she had two children and two stepchildren. Her elder daughter with Blue, Eliza Harvey, is also an ABC journalist who is married to Adam Harvey, a son of journalist Peter Harvey.

== Works ==
- Doogue, Geraldine; Kirkwood, Peter (2004), Tomorrow's Islam: Uniting age-old beliefs and a modern world, ABC Books for the Australian Broadcasting Corporation, ISBN 978-0-7333-1543-5
- Doogue, Geraldine (27 August 2014), The Climb: Conversations with Australian women in power, The Text Publishing Company, ISBN 978-1-922182-32-6

== Honours and awards ==
Officer of the Order of Australia (AO)	9 June 2003, "For service to the community, particularly as a commentator for social change, and to the media through raising public awareness of issues involving ethics, values, religion and spirituality."

- Two Penguin Awards for excellence in broadcasting
- United Nations Media Peace Prize
- Churchill Fellowship for social and cultural reporting
- Doctor of the University, University of Newcastle, Australia, 2015.
- Honorary degree, Australian National University, 2019
