= Vivian Silver =

Canadian-Israeli peace activist (1949–2023)

- ויויאן סילבר
- Born: February 2, 1949; Winnipeg, Manitoba, Canada
- Died: October 7, 2023 (aged 74); Be'eri, Israel
- Cause of death: Be'eri massacre
- Burial place: Be'eri
- Citizenship: Canada; Israel
- Employer: Negev Institute for Strategies of Peace and Development (1998–2014)
- Organization: Women Wage Peace
- Known for: Peace activism
- Children: 2

Vivian Silver (Hebrew: ויויאן סילבר; February 2, 1949 – October 7, 2023) was a Canadian-Israeli peace activist and women's rights activist. She was murdered in the Be'eri massacre, a part of the October 7 attacks.

== Early life and education ==
Silver was born and raised in Winnipeg, Manitoba, Canada.

Silver first visited Israel in 1968, during her junior year of college. She studied abroad at the Hebrew University of Jerusalem, where she studied psychology and English literature. Silver was also heavily involved in the North American Jewish Students Network, where she was the administrator of the Jewish Student Press Service beginning in 1972. In this capacity, Silver began publishing articles about Israeli–Palestinian relations. In her senior year of college, Silver co-founded the Student Zionist Alliance on her campus and was subsequently invited to the Student Zionist Alliance national conference in Montreal that year. She graduated from the University of Manitoba.

In 1973, Silver and Shifra Bronznick organized the first National Conference of Jewish Women.

== Activism ==
Silver immigrated to Israel in 1974 and became a member of kibbutz Gezer as part of the Habonim Dror movement. At Gezer, she became the kibbutz's secretary, one of the few women to do so; later, she became chairperson of the community. At times, she received pushback from within the kibbutz for her refusal to adhere to gender norms and her choice to take on traditionally male work, such as overseeing construction. Silver's early activism focused on women's rights and gender disparities in Israeli society. To this end, she founded the United Kibbutz Movement's Department to Advance Gender Equality in 1981. She also worked within the Knesset on the sub-committee for the Advancement of Women in Work and the Economy, for the New Israel Fund, and on the Steering Committee of Shatil.

She moved to Be'eri, a kibbutz near the Gaza border, in 1990, along with her husband and two sons. During this time, she became better acquainted with the local Bedouin community and Gazans. She served as executive director for the Negev Institute for Strategies of Peace and Development (NISPED) beginning in 1998. Silver worked within the kibbutz to organize programs to help Gazans, such as job trainings, and ensured that Gazan construction workers at the kibbutz were paid fairly.

In 1999, Silver and Amal Elsana Alh'jooj co-founded the Arab-Jewish Center for Equality, Empowerment and Cooperation, an off-shoot of NISPED. Silver served as the center's director prior to the second intifada. The center organized projects in Israel, Gaza, and the West Bank. In 2010, Silver and Alh'jooj received the Victor J. Goldberg Prize for Peace in the Middle East, an annual prize given by the Institute of International Education to pairs of Arab and Israeli activists working towards peace.

Before the closure of the Gaza border in 2007, Silver worked with Gazan residents in cross-cultural projects. One group she founded, Creating Peace, focused on fostering business connections between Palestinian and Israeli artisans.

Silver was a former board member of B'Tselem, a Jerusalem-based human rights organization. She was also involved with Alliance for Middle East Peace, as well as a number of their member organizations. As part of this work, she helped organize and lead tours of the Israeli side of the Israeli–Gaza border, as a way to raise awareness about the struggles of Gaza residents.

Silver officially retired in 2014. Following her retirement, and the 2014 Gaza War, Silver co-founded Women Wage Peace, an interfaith grassroots organization. Silver also began volunteering with Road to Recovery and Project Rozana to transport Gazan patients who were traveling to Jerusalem for treatment.

On October 4, 2023, Silver helped to organize a peace rally in Jerusalem, which attracted 1,500 Israeli and Palestinian women.

== Disappearance and death ==
On October 7, 2023, Silver was killed in the Be'eri massacre, an attack by Palestinian militants on kibbutz Be'eri, where she lived, as part of October 7 attacks, which marked the start of the Gaza war. During the attack, Silver spoke to her sister on the phone and reported hearing Hamas militants outside her home. She also messaged friends on WhatsApp with a similar message. In addition, she gave a telephone interview to an Israeli radio station while hiding in her home's safe room, arguing that the attack demonstrated the need for a peace deal. Her final text messages to her son Yonatan Zeigen were sent at 10:54 AM.

Silver was initially believed to have been abducted and taken to Gaza as a hostage. Her home was found burned and gutted when Israeli responders arrived, but because there was no body or signs of struggle, Silver was assumed to have been abducted.

Silver's family and friends created a Facebook page "Missing Vivian Silver" to try to collect more information about her possible whereabouts and asked the Red Cross and the Canadian government for assistance in finding Silver and securing her release.

Silver's burned remains, which had been found at the remains of her home, were identified by DNA testing five weeks after the attack, and she was confirmed dead on November 13, 2023.

Following the announcement of Silver's death, tributes to her were shared by B'Tselem, the Jewish Federation of Winnipeg, and Women Wage Peace. Online tributes to Silver were also posted by Canadian politician and human rights lawyer Irwin Cotler, Canadian foreign minister Mélanie Joly, Canadian ambassador to Israel Lisa Stadelbauer, and Israeli politician Tzipi Livni. On November 14, Canadian Prime Minister Justin Trudeau also recognized Silver's death at an event, saying that she would "be deeply missed".

Silver's funeral was held at the kibbutz of Gezer, where she had lived from 1974 until 1990, on November 16. Approximately 1,500 people attended her funeral. She was buried in Be'eri at a private service.

== Recognition and legacy ==
In 2011, Haaretz named Silver as one of the "10 Most Influential Anglo Immigrants" to Israel and received the IIE Victor J. Goldberg Prize for Peace in the Middle East along with Amal Elsana Alh'jooj.

In August 2024, a community kitchen in the Zomi displaced persons camp in the al-Mawasi humanitarian zone in southern Gaza was named after Silver following the approval of one of her sons. The camp was established by Damour for Community Development, Clean Shelter, the Wonderbag Foundation, and UNICEF.

Her son Yonaton Zeigen has set up a Vivian Silver Impact Award. The prize will be awarded annually to two women, Arab and Jewish, who show great promise or have demonstrated significant accomplishments in one of the areas that embody Vivian's values and actions.

== Personal life ==
Silver was Jewish. She was married to Lewis Zeigen and had two sons and four grandchildren.
