= Tel Aviv Cheetahs Football Club =

Australian rules football club based in Tel Aviv, Israel

The Tel Aviv Cheetahs is an Australian rules football club based in Tel Aviv, Israel.^{1}

Tel Aviv Cheetahs Football Club logo

== Club history ==
The team originally formed in May 2018, when a few players from Jerusalem Peace Lions club moved to Tel Aviv and began to practice in Yarkon Park.

In August 2018 months the club received its name, and began its preparation for the AFL Euro Cup 2018.

The Tel Aviv Cheetahs represent a continuation of a decade long history of Australian rules football in Israel. However, it is the first club to focus more on the sport itself rather than utilising its spirit and values in activist work previously done by the Peace Team project curated by Peres Center for Peace, later continued by the Jerusalem Peace Lions football club.

While many AFL clubs outside Australia typically consist of Australian expats players, the Tel Aviv Cheetahs club chose a grassroots way of developing, and is predominantly Israeli, with a few Australian-born players that help maintain the authentic Australian cultural component as the team management works to adapt the game to a wider Israeli market and attract more local players and partners.

As of March 2019 it is the first officially registered and the only active Australian rules football club in Israel.

In 2025, the Tel Aviv Cheetah's participated in the 2025 AFL Israel Winter League against the newly formed Lions. The Cheetahs won the first game 40-31 in wet conditions but lost in the second game 70-96. The third game is set to take place on the 7th of March 2025.

== Club symbols ==
The current Tel Aviv Cheetahs guernsey is yellow and red with the team's emblem of a yellow cheetah across a red shield with white claw marks in the lower right featured on the left chest.

== AFL Euro Cup 2018 ==
After carrying out a successful crowdfunding campaign that allowed the team to participate in the AFL Euro Cup 2018, the Tel Aviv Cheetahs travelled to Cork, Ireland, to represent Israel on the international stage.

It was the first time the Cheetahs participated in the AFL Europe official tournament.

The team played total of 4 games, of which they lost 3 and won 1 final match, placing 11th overall.

In the first game the Tel Aviv Cheetahs faced the Croatian Knights with the final score of 59-2. The second game was played against the Netherlands. The Flying Dutchmen won that match with the 23-8. The third game was against Wales. The Red Dragons won the match 30-12. In the fourth and final game The Tel Aviv Cheetahs played against Czech Republic. A victory against the Czech Dragons 10-16 has become the first victory of the team at any official tournament.

== Club affiliations and partnerships ==
In August 2018 the Tel Aviv Cheetahs became a part of the OddBalls platform in joined effort to develop the game of Australian rules football in Israel. Among some of the goals are educating Israeli public about the game, development of the national league, and introducing women's teams.
