= Shorouq Society for Women =

Palestinian non-profit

The Shorouq Society for Women (Arabic: جمعية شروق النسوية العيزرية, romanized: Jamʻīyat Shurūq al-Niswīyah al-ʻAyzarīyah) is a non-profit which aims to economically empower Palestinian women. It is based in Bethany, in the West Bank. It is headed by Fatima Faroun.

The non-profit is affiliated with Children of Peace and the Alliance for Middle East Peace.

== Activities ==
In 2009, the non-profit began partnering with the Negev Institute for Strategies of Peace and Development on a program, Joint Ventures for Peace, that saw Palestinian and Israeli women receiving job trainings together. The program also aimed to develop business partnerships between the Palestinians and Israelis.

That same year, the organization participated in an exhibition at Palestinian Cultural Week in Amman, Jordan.

In 2011, the organization opened an Economic Development Center.

Beginning in 2016, the non-profit began a breast cancer awareness campaign in Jerusalem in collaboration with the Palestinian Ministry of Health. The campaign included educational lectures, education on self-examination exams, and the founding of a forum for breast cancer survivors.

The organization has also taken part in the distribution of aid, such as food or school bags for students, to families in need.
