= Jerusalem Peace Lions Football Club =

The Jerusalem Peace Lions Football Club ( אריות השלום in Hebrew, اسود السلام in Arabic) is an Israeli-Palestinian Australian rules football club based in Jerusalem, Israel.

Jerusalem Peace Lions' official logo

The club has its roots in the Peace Team project that was curated by Peres Center for Peace and Innovation.

== Club history ==
The Jerusalem Peace Lions club was formed in May 2015 by few participants of the Peace Team in order to continue the Peace Team's work of utilising Australian rules football as an instrument to bring Israelis and Palestinians together through sport.

After successful crowdfunding efforts Peace Team's I and II rising star Yonatan Belik together with Peace Team II captain Avi Benvenisty and players Saad Barhoom and Wael Shama formed the club, continuing Australian rules football development in the region.

== Club symbols ==
The Jerusalem Peace Lions club is often referred to as JPL. Its emblem is a golden and white lion across a dark green shield. Club's current guernsey is white with a black lion on one side and a rainbow-like sequence of colours green, white, red, blue and black on the other.

== International participation ==
The Jerusalem Peace Lions debuted on the international arena in 2015 when the team was invited to represent their region in AFL Euro Cup that took place in Umag, Croatia. At the tournament JPL played with Austria, Denmark, Norway and Holland.

The club later also participated in AFL Euro Cup 2016 that took place in Lisbon, Portugal. In that competition the Lions faced Irish, French and Russian national teams.

The Jerusalem Peace Lions also returned to the AFL Euro Cup in 2017, which took place in Bordeaux, France.

At a pool stage JPL face the national teams of Switzerland, Germany and Austria. The first match against the Swiss Mountain Cocks ended with a victory for JPL and a solid score of 0.3(3) - 3.8(26). However, in next to matches The Jerusalem Peace Lions were defeated: the German Eagles crushed JPL with stunning 9.6(60) to 0.2(2), and the Austrian Avalanches scored 5.3(33) to respectable 3.2(20) points by Lions.

In the competition for 9-12 places JPL lost to the Scottish Clansmen 5.3(33) - 2.7(19). The Jerusalem Lions won their final match, securing an overall 11th place at the tournament, by beating the Swedish Elks with impressive 15.5(95) to 2.2(14).

== Domestic tournaments ==
As of 2018 Israel and Palestine never had an AFL league with the Jerusalem Peace Lions being the only club in the country until May 2018 when the Tel Aviv Cheetahs Football Club was formed. The only domestic tournament was an annual event organised by the Australian Embassy in Israel, in which JPL got to play with the teams consisted of volunteers who come together for that specific event.
