= Saad El-Hawli =

Australian rules footballer (born 2001)

- El-Hawli in September 2026

Personal information
- Full name: Saad El-Hawli
- Born: 15 May 2001 (age 25)
- Original teams: Western Jets (NAB League); Northern Bullants (VFL)
- Draft: No. 13, 2024 mid-season draft
- Debut: Round 3, 2025, Essendon vs. Port Adelaide, at Marvel Stadium
- Height: 184 cm (6 ft 0 in)

Playing career^{1}
Years	Club	Games (Goals)
2024–2026	Essendon	17 (3)
- ^{1} Playing statistics correct to the end of round 22, 2026.

Saad El-Hawli (born 15 May 2001) is an Australian rules footballer who most recently played for the Essendon Football Club in the Australian Football League (AFL). He was selected by Essendon with pick 13 in the 2024 mid-season rookie draft.

== Early career ==
El-Hawli joined the Western Jets for the 2019 NAB League season. He averaged 8.25 disposals and kicked 6 goals from a total of 12 games. Following the cancellation of many local football seasons in 2020 due to the impact of the COVID-19 pandemic in Victoria, he joined Altona in the Western Region Football League (WRFL) in 2021. He was the club's leading goalkicker for the 2021 season, kicking 26 goals, and also was part of the 2021 WRFL Team of the Year. El-Hawli also participated in the Bachar Houli Foundation.

In January 2022, El-Hawli signed with the Werribee Football Club in the Victorian Football League (VFL). He made his VFL debut in round 1 of the 2022 season against Frankston, and kicked his first goal in round 3 against Southport. However, he was omitted from Werribee's side after round 5 and did not return until round 20 against Brisbane.

For the 2023 VFL season, El-Hawli moved to the Northern Bullants. He impressed early in a practice match, catching the eye of Essendon. El-Hawli debuted for the Bullants in round 1 against Richmond, collecting 20 disposals, and kicked a career-high four goals against Box Hill in round 7. In 2024, El-Hawli averaged 25.8 disposals and six marks per match while playing for the Bullants. His final game for the club came in round 9 against Sydney, where he had 33 disposals and kicked two goals.

In May 2024 it was reported by Melbourne radio station 1116 SEN that Essendon had shown interest in El-Hawli ahead of the 2024 AFL mid-season rookie draft.

== AFL career ==
El-Hawli was drafted by Essendon with pick 13 of the 2024 mid-season draft. In his second game for Essendon's reserves team, he recorded 27 disposals and kicked four goals against Carlton, but suffered a syndesmosis injury that resulted in him missing most of the rest of the season and unable to make his AFL debut that year.

El-Hawli made his AFL debut in round 3 of the 2025 season against Port Adelaide at Marvel Stadium.

At the conclusion of the 2026 season, El-Hawli was delisted, following seventeen games at AFL level across two years.

== Personal life ==
El-Hawli is a devout Muslim, and was fasting for the holy month of Ramadan during the time of his AFL debut. His cousin is Bachar Houli, who is also a Muslim and a three-time AFL premiership player with Richmond. They share Lebanese heritage.

== Statistics ==
Updated to the end of round 22, 2026.

Legend
G	Goals	K	Kicks	D	Disposals	T	Tackles
B	Behinds	H	Handballs	M	Marks

Season	Team	No.	Games	Totals							Averages (per game)							Votes
Season	Team	No.	Games	G	B	K	H	D	M	T	G	B	K	H	D	M	T	Votes
2025	Essendon	41	9	1	0	63	37	100	28	13	0.1	0.0	7.0	4.1	11.1	3.1	1.4	0
2026	Essendon	41	8	2	2	70	47	117	29	13	0.3	0.3	8.8	5.9	14.6	3.6	1.6	0
Career			17	3	2	133	84	217	57	26	0.2	0.1	7.8	4.9	12.8	3.4	1.5	0
