= Negev Institute for Strategies of Peace and Development =

Israeli NGO promoting peace and development

Arab-Jewish Center for Empowerment, Equality, and Cooperation – Negev Institute for Strategies of Peace and Economic Development
- Abbreviation: AJEEC-NISPED
- Formation: 1997
- Founder: Yehuda Paz (NISPED); Amal Elsana Alh'jooj (AJEEC)
- Type: Non-profit organization
- Purpose: Humanitarian; Activist
- Headquarters: Beersheba, Israel
- Location: Israel
- Fields: Shared society; Youth services; Community development; Health
- Chairman: Kher Albaz
- CEOs: Sliman Al-Amour and Ilan Amit
- Website: ajeec-nisped.org.il

AJEEC-NISPED (Arab-Jewish Center for Empowerment, Equality, and Cooperation – Negev Institute for Strategies of Peace and Economic Development, in Arabic: أجيك – معهد النقب) is an Israeli-based organization for social change.

The organization focuses on four main areas: promoting shared life between Arabs and Jews across the country, leadership and youth engagement (ages 15–25), community development in Arab society in Israel, and promoting child health and wellbeing.

== Governance and staffing ==
The organization follows a shared management model, with each role having a Jewish and an Arab/Palestinian staff member. The organization's chairman is Kher Albaz, and the co-CEOs are Sliman Al-Amour and Dr. Ilan Amit.

AJEEC-NISPED is one of the largest civil society organizations in Israel, employing about 200 staff, and engaging over 20,000 individuals beneficiaries through the organization's activities and programs each year.

== History ==
The Negev Institute for Strategies of Peace and Economic Development (NISPED) was founded in 1997 by Dr. Yehuda Paz. Paz remained the chair of NISPED until his death in 2013.

It began its activities in the Negev in 2000. In 2015, the organization expanded its operations to Arab municipalities and mixed cities in central and northern Israel and now operates nationwide.

In 2011, co-executive directors of NISPED, Vivian Silver and Amal Elsana Alh'jooj, received the Victor J. Goldberg Prize for Peace in the Middle East from the Institute of International Education.

== Arab-Jewish Center for Equality, Empowerment and Cooperation ==
The Arab-Jewish Center for Equality, Empowerment and Cooperation (AJEEC) focuses on peace and development projects within Israel and the Palestinian territories, particularly among Arab-Bedouin communities in Israel. It was founded in 2000 by founding director Amal Elsana Alh'jooj. AJEEC is one of the largest civil society organizations in Israel. It is a member of the Alliance for Middle East Peace.

"Ajeec" means "I come towards you" in Arabic. This reflects the community approach guiding the organization's work in developing and leading responses according to the assets and needs of different communities, in partnership with local leadership and government entities.

=== Community development work ===
In 2008, Al Sanabel, a catering program, was opened in Hura with the support of AJEEC. Al Sanabel provides hot meals to Bedouin schools, and employs a number of Bedouin women.

By 2011, AJEEC was offering job training programs for Bedouin residents. Women who went through the programs took on jobs as photographers, caterers, and DJs.

=== Shared society work ===
In the 2000s, AJEEC began developing Co-operative Produce for Peace, which would see Palestinian and Israeli producers of cherry tomatoes, strawberries, and sweet potatoes working together in a cooperative. The project was suspended in 2007, following Hamas taking control of the Gaza Strip and the Israel government declaring a blockade on the border.

In 2009, AJEEC launched Joint Ventures for Peace in collaboration with the Shorouq Society for Women. The project brought together Israeli and Palestinian women entrepreneurs and craftspeople, who underwent training together to grow their businesses outside of their home territories. It was suspended during the 2014 Gaza War due to logistical difficulties.

=== Health work ===
By 2011, AJEEC was running education programs on the health risks of early marriage and consanguine marriage.

In the mid-2010s, AJEEC did several studies in collaboration with the West Bank-based Green Land Society for Health on the recycling of e-waste in the West Bank, and its impact on worker's health and the environment.

Since the onset of the COVID-19 pandemic, AJEEC has helped to provide COVID testing services to Bedouin residents. They received resources, training, and access to ambulances from Negev municipalities and the Magen David Adom.

=== Youth work ===
In 2009, AJEEC founded the Shared Society program, which pairs Bedouin and Jewish schools. Students meet once a month to study together, while teachers take trainings together.

By 2011, AJEEC was offering services such as preschool programs, homework assistance and helping to re-enroll girls who had dropped out of school. AJEEC ran 21 daycare centers at the time, largely employing local Bedouin mothers.

AJEEC had also established the program Negev L’Kulanu (English: Negev for All of Us) by 2011. The program brought together Bedouin and Jewish junior high school students in both dialogue and cooperative projects.

==== Shabibat AJEEC ====
AJEEC has a youth division, called Shabibat AJEEC, founded in 2002 by Sliman Al Amor. It operates under the Ministry of Education, and serves around 9,100 people as of 2024. Originally focused on southern Israel, the initiative has spread to the rest of the country in recent years. Shabibat AJEEC does Arabic-language outreach to primarily Bedouin youth through after-school programs and activities. They also provide programs and opportunities for Bedouin and Jewish youth to interact in positive environments.

Shabibat AJEEC holds a gap year program for Arab youth, which is meant to parallel the time Jewish youth spend in the National Service.

=== Wartime work ===
Following the October 7 attacks, AJEEC responded to the needs of affected Bedouin residents, helping to fund bomb shelters, donate food, connect residents to Arabic-speaking organizations who assist in dealing with trauma, and organize programs for children. AJEEC has also encouraged MKs to visit unrecognized Bedouin villages, and led tours of such visits, to underscore the issues facing Bedouin communities.

== International work ==
NISPED has also launched programs outside of the Middle East.

NISPED provided aid in Sri Lanka following the 2004 tsunami. They continued to provide aid through 2007.

Another such project was Communities Prosper Together, which was launched in Cameroon in 2019. The project provided various job trainings to promote positive relations between ethnic groups and community resiliency.
