= Ian Carroll (Australian TV executive) =

Australian television executive (1946-2011)

- Born: 17 November 1946; Melbourne, Australia
- Died: 19 August 2011 (aged 64); Sydney, Australia
- Occupation: Television executive
- Spouses: Jillian (div.); Geraldine Doogue (1987–2011)
- Children: 4

Ian Robert Carroll (17 November 1946 – 19 August 2011) was an Australian television executive, primarily at the Australian Broadcasting Corporation (ABC). At the ABC, Carroll established many news and current affairs programs including Lateline and the 7.30 Report, and developed many others. He was chief executive of ABC International's Australia Network, director of innovation from the time the division was set up in 2007, and established two channels for ABC Digital Television. He developed iView and apps for mobile devices, as well as overhauling the ABC's websites.

He also worked at The Age and the Nine Network.

== Death ==
Carroll died from pancreatic cancer on 19 August 2011. In remembering his service, ABC managing director Mark Scott asked: "Is there anyone in this country who has thought more about what the news is and what the news should be, how the news should be packaged and how the news should be delivered than Ian?"
