= Amal Elsana Alh'jooj =

Palestinian peace activist

- أمل الصانع الحجوج Amal əṣ-Ṣānaʿ əl-Ḥəjūj (Levantine Arabic); אמל אלסאנע אלחג'וג (Hebrew)
- Born: 1972 (age 53–54); Tel Arad, Israel
- Education: Ben-Gurion University of the Negev; McGill University; Harvard Kennedy School
- Children: 2

Amal Elsana Alh'jooj (born 1972) is a Bedouin Palestinian feminist, peace activist, and community organizer known for her grassroots work promoting universal access to rights and social justice in the Global South. She is an Arab citizen of Israel currently living in Canada.

She has organized movements and civil society projects around the issues of minority rights in Israel, particularly for women and indigenous peoples. She has a BA in Social Work from Ben-Gurion University of the Negev, an MA in Community Organizing, and a PhD in Social Work from McGill University's School of Social Work. She has also conducted postdoctoral research at the Women and Public Policy Program at Harvard Kennedy School and served as a postdoctoral fellow at McGill University. She is currently based in Montreal, where she is an Associate Professor at McGill University's School of Social Work and works as the Executive Director of PLEDJ (Promoting Leadership for Empowerment, Development and Justice).

== Early life and early education ==
Elsana Alh'jooj was born in the unrecognized Bedouin village of Tel Arad and grew up in Laqiya, a northern Negev Bedouin town. She was her parents' fifth daughter, and the first of their children to be born in Soroka Medical Center rather than a tent. Her father was an agricultural worker in Israel, and gave her the Arabic name Amal "Hope" in the hope that his wife would have sons after her. Her family's home had no running water, electricity, doors or windows. From age five until age 17, she worked as a shepherd.

In 1993, Elsana Alh'jooj entered Ben-Gurion University of the Negev, where she studied social work. At the time, she was the first woman from her tribe to attend university, and one of only two Bedouin students at the university at the time. During her time at university, she was head of the Arab Student Union. She graduated in 1996. As a master's student, she was in the first cohort of MSW fellows to participate in the McGill Middle East Program in Civil Society and Peace-building (MMEP), a social work program which brings together Jordanian, Palestinian, Israeli, and Syrian students to study for a year at McGill University. She went on to pursue a PhD at McGill University in 2012.

In 2019, Elsana Alh'jooj pursued a post-doctorate at the Harvard Kennedy School of Public Policy. She focused on gender-based violence, specifically among Arab-Israeli communities.

== Activism ==
As a child growing up in a patriarchal culture, Elsana Alh'jooj was often treated less fairly than her five younger brothers. This was a source of frustration throughout her childhood, and her grandmother helped her to direct that frustration towards the oppressive systems that perpetuated inequality, rather than individuals. Although Elsana Alh'jooj first became aware of patriarchy, she also soon became aware of how her community was harmed by government policies and gaps in systemic infrastructure that gave less support to Palestinian communities, including Bedouin communities.

Elsana Ahl'jooj delivered her first political speech in second grade during a march against the 1982 Lebanon War, protesting the war and advocating for peace. As she explained, "[A]fter that, when there would be a demonstration against government house demolitions or uprooting of trees from our village, I’d be the one to give the speech." When she was twelve, she wrote a letter to her father advocating for herself to attend a Hebrew school in Haifa. Although she was unsuccessful, her father praised her writing skills, and Elsana Alh'jooj has recognized this event as her first "formal attempt to stand up for women's rights". In the next few years she earned a reputation as a troublemaker after founding a literacy group to teach local women to read and write. At age 15, she was arrested during "a protest against Israel’s policy toward Palestinians at her high school", and subsequently spent a night in jail. While in jail, one police officer encouraged her to pursue her education to better drive change, a sentiment which inspired her future activism.

When she was 17, Elsana Alh'jooj founded the first organization for Bedouin women, Desert Embroidery, which focuses on empowerment, job training and reinforcing the role of embroidery as both creative and social expression in [Bedouin] women’s lives".

While at McGill University in Canada, Elsana Alh'jooj became more familiar with Jews and Judaism. After finishing her master's degree in 1999, she returned to Israel, where she resolved to begin building bridges between Israeli and Palestinian communities, particularly through women. She worked at a community advocacy center in an underserved Jewish neighbourhood in Beersheba, where she continued to build connections and learn.

Elsana Alh'jooj founded the Arab-Jewish Center for Equality, Empowerment and Cooperation (AJEEC) in 2000 as a division of the Negev Institute for Strategies of Peace and Development (NISPED), which she co-directed alongside Vivian Silver as AJEEC-NISPED from 2005 to 2012. With the organization, Elsana Alh'jooj focused on raising standards of living among Bedouin communities in Israel and building connections between Bedouin and Jewish communities. In 2010, the two won the Victor J. Goldberg Prize for Peace in the Middle East, given by the Institute for International Education.

From 2015 to 2020, Elsana Alh'jooj was the executive director of McGill University's International Community Action Network (ICAN), which she had attended as a student while it was called the previously the McGill Middle East Program in Civil Society and Peace-building (MMEP). She was a board member of the New Israel Fund.

Elsana Alh'jooj founded PLEDJ in 2020, a research and training non-profit that networks global indigenous and marginalized knowledges to mobilize social justice and address international conflict. The organization amplifies local leadership by strengthening the relationship between academia and community practice in the Global South. She developed the Holistic Reconciliation for Newcomer Families program with Montreal City Mission, which helps immigrants moving to Montreal.

Following the October 7 attacks, Alh'jooj led a Jewish-Palestinian dialogue program and paid tribute to her slain friend and collaborator Vivian Silver.

In 2025, Alh'jooj spoke at the 10th anniversary of the Festival of Literary Diversity.

== Writing ==
In 2023, Alh'jooj published a memoir, Hope is a Woman's Name, about her work as an activist navigating interwoven patriarchal and nationalist systems of oppression. It was published by Halban Publishers.

== Personal life ==
Alh'jooj moved to Canada in 2012, and currently lives in Montreal with her husband and two twin children. She is a Muslim and wears hijab as a matter of personal choice.
