= Herbert Pundik =

Danish-Israeli journalist and author (1927–2019)

- נחום פונדק; Nahum Pundak
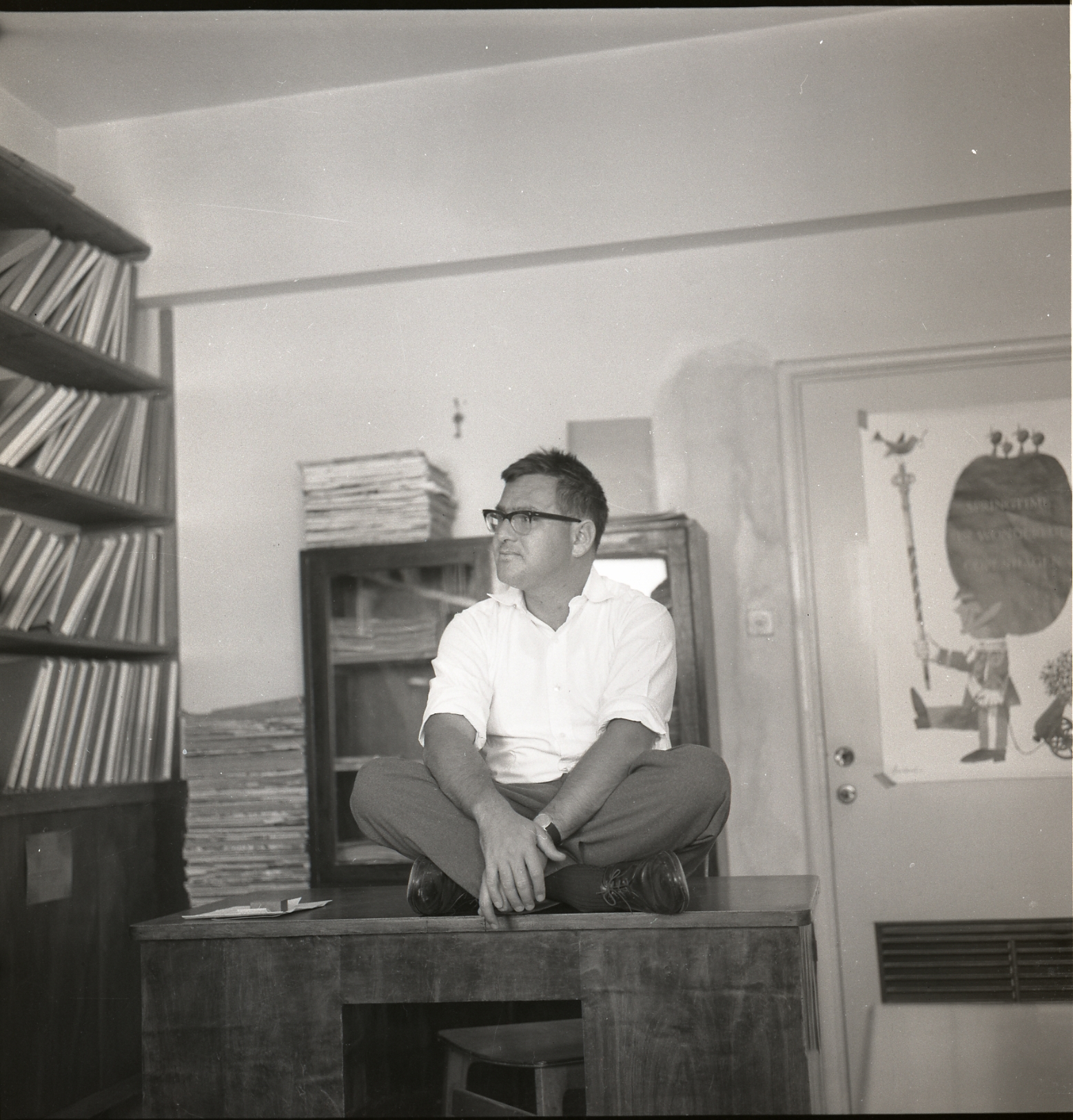
- Herbert Pundik (1972)
- Born: September 23, 1927; Copenhagen, Denmark
- Died: December 8, 2019 (aged 92)

Herbert Pundik or Nahum Pundak (Hebrew: נחום פונדק; September 23, 1927 – December 8, 2019) was a Danish-Israeli journalist and author. He worked for the newspaper Information and as a correspondent for Danmarks Radio. Beginning in 1965, he worked for the newspaper Politiken, and from 1970 to 1993 was the paper's executive editor. Under his leadership Politiken went from sloping sales figures to becoming the largest daily newspaper in Denmark.

== Biography ==
Herbert was born in Copenhagen, Denmark in 1927 to Danish Jewish parents, who had migrated to Denmark from Ukraine in order to escape threatening pogroms. He escaped to Sweden during the German occupation of Denmark in World War II, and in 1945 enlisted in the Danish Brigade in Sweden. From 1948–1949 he served in the Israeli Haganah. He admitted to spying for Israel for a decade during the 1960s.

His son, Ron Pundak, was an Israeli historian, who played a vital role in establishing the diplomatic connections between the Israeli and the Palestinians which eventually led to the Oslo Accords. Ron died on 11 April 2014 after a lengthy battle with cancer. His son Uri was killed during the 1973 Yom Kippur War.

In the years from 1973 to 2019, Herbert Pundik's family was increasingly active in the peace movement. Already in 1967, Pundik warned about the consequences of the occupation of Palestine and over the years he became a strong voice for peace and reconciliation with the Palestinian people.

Herbert Pundik was also active in founding the Parents Circle, an organisation for Israeli and Palestinian families who lost their loved ones in the conflict. The organisation works for reconciliation and for the ending of the occupation of Palestine.

While executive editor, he continued to live with his family in Tel Aviv, where they had lived since 1954. Until his death, Pundik continued to live in Israel while working for Politiken as a senior foreign correspondent. In 2008, he was appointed as adjunct professor at Aalborg University.

== Awards and honors ==
- 1966 Cavlingprisen
- 1993 Rosenkjærprisen
- 1993 Modersmål-Prisen
- 1996 Paul Hammerich-Prisen
