= Ron Pundak =

Israeli historian and journalist (1955–2014)

Ron Pudack
- רון פונדק
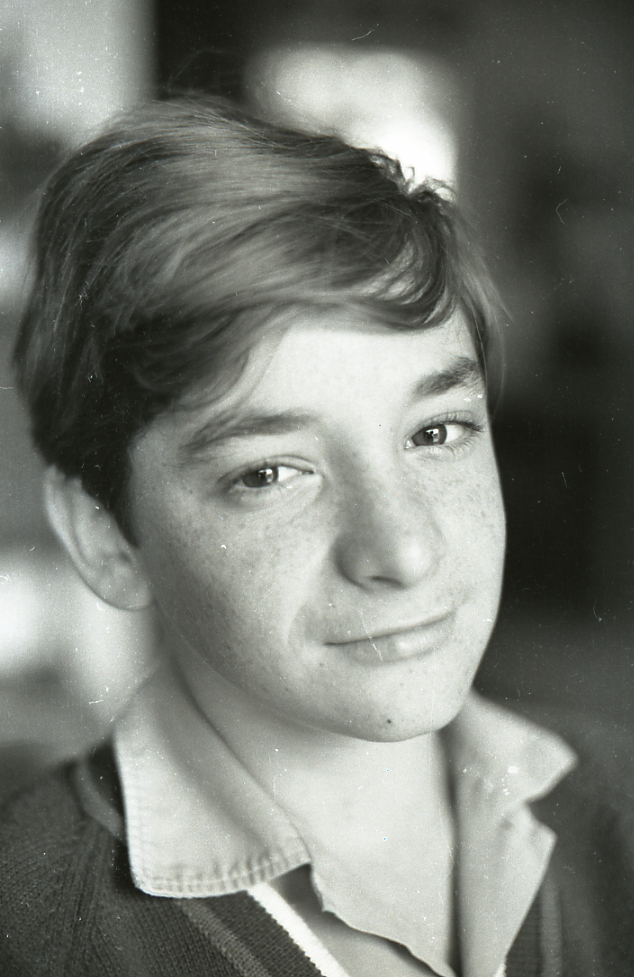
- Ron Pundak as a youth
- Born: May 14, 1955; Tel Aviv
- Died: April 11, 2014 (aged 58)
- Education: University of London
- Occupations: Journalist, Managing Director, Historian
- Known for: One of the architects behind the Oslo peace process
- Children: May Pundak
- Father: Herbert Pundik

Ron Pundak (Hebrew: רון פונדק; 14 May 1955 – 11 April 2014) was an Israeli historian and journalist. He played an important role in starting the Oslo peace process in 1993, and was part of the core group behind the Geneva Initiative. Pundak was the executive director of the Peres Center for Peace in Tel Aviv-Yafo and co-chairman of its Palestinian–Israeli Peace NGO Forum. He was on the board of directors of the Aix Group.

== Background ==
Ron Pundak was born in Tel Aviv. His parents were Danish Jewish immigrants from Denmark. He was the son of Herbert Pundik, a Danish-Israeli journalist and author. His older brother Uri was killed in the 1973 Yom Kippur war.In 1991, Pundak graduated from the University of London with a PhD in Middle Eastern Political History.

== Career ==
After his return to Israel, he worked as a journalist at the Israeli daily newspaper Haaretz for one year. Together with fellow academic Yair Hirschfeld, he founded an NGO called the Economic Cooperation Foundation (ECF), through which they established relationships with Palestinian leaders, which eventually led to the Oslo peace process. Pundak was a critical part of the success the Oslo channel brought. Because of how unorthodox his and Hirschfeld's style of diplomatic negotiations were, and how far away they are from government diplomacy, they were so successful. During the Oslo process, Pundak and Hirschfeld also served as advisors to the Palestinians, offering them "Red Lines" which they couldn't cross in their negotiations. Since they were tied to the government but not confined by it, they could provide them with insight as to what they could and could not achieve.

In 2001, Pundak became director general of the Peres Center for Peace in Tel Aviv-Yafo, a position he held until 2011. He was the subject of the article written by Yael Patir Remembering Ron Pundak, which was published in the Israeli-Palestinian Journal of Politics, Economics, and Culture in 2014.

== Personal life ==
Pundak died age 58 on 11 April 2014 after a long period with cancer. His daughter is Israeli peace activist May Pundak.
