= Project Rozana =

Australian non-profit organization for providing healthcare to Palestinians

Project Rozana is a non-profit based in Australia that aims to connect Palestinians in Gaza and the West Bank with appropriate medical training and healthcare, and, by extension, build connections between Palestinian and Israeli citizens. It was founded in 2013 by Hadassah Australia and their president, Ron Finkel.

It is a member of the Alliance for Middle East Peace.

== History ==
In 2012, a four-year-old Palestinian girl named Rozana Salawhi fell nine stories out of the window of her family's apartment near Ramallah. Her mother insisted on taking Rozana to Hadassah Medical Center, as she knew they would be more equipped to treat her daughter than the local hospital. This decision was credited with saving Rozana's life. Ron Finkel, after hearing the story, was inspired to create an organization which could promote goodwill between Palestinian and Israeli communities by providing healthcare training to underserved hospitals.

Project Rozana was officially founded in 2013.

As of 2018, the non-profit had already provided funding to support Arabic-speaking paramedics and medical interpreters at Hadassah Hospital and Tel HaShomer Hospital.

In collaboration with World Vision Australia, Project Rozana funded the Binational School of Psychotherapy at Hadassah Hospital, which trains Palestinian healthcare workers in treating children suffering from PTSD. They have also provided financial support to Ziv Medical Center in Safed, and their work in treating patients injured in the Syrian civil war.

In 2019, the non-profit launched the Aiia Maasarwe Memorial Medical Fellowship Program (AMMMFP) in honor of Aiia Maasarwe, an Arab-Israeli student murdered in Melbourne, Australia. The fellowship allows Palestinian recipients to work in Tel Aviv hospitals to develop their healthcare knowledge and skills. The fellowship was interrupted due to the COVID-19 pandemic, but was restarted in early 2023.

In May 2020, following the outbreak of COVID-19, Project Rozana delivered hospital-grade ventilators and other needed medical equipment to the Palestinian Authority. They also provided on-site training at Rambam Hospital for Palestinian ICU workers.

In mid-2022, Project Rozana collaborated with the Sheba Medical Center at Tel Hashomer to set up a remote OB-GYN unit in Hebron, to provide Palestinian health workers with training in OB-GYN telemedicine. In September 2022, Project Rozana received US$2.3 million from USAID to fund a “systematic approach to cross-border cooperation as a form of health diplomacy and a way to improve health delivery”.

== Goals ==
The non-profit focuses on three specific short-term goals: providing transportation for patients, covering the cost of medical procedures not covered by the Palestinian Authority, and training healthcare workers. They also have a long-term goal of addressing Type 2 diabetes, macular degeneration, and kidney failure, three common problems in Arab communities.

Areas of focus for trainings provided by the non-profit include dialysis, palliative care for children with terminal illnesses, and pediatric emergency medicine.

Project Rozana's ultimate goal is to build the infrastructure needed to allow Palestinian healthcare systems to be self reliant.
