= Peres Center for Peace =

Israeli organization for the promotion of peace and innovation

Coordinates: 32.0372°N 34.7461°E

The Peres Center for Peace and Innovation

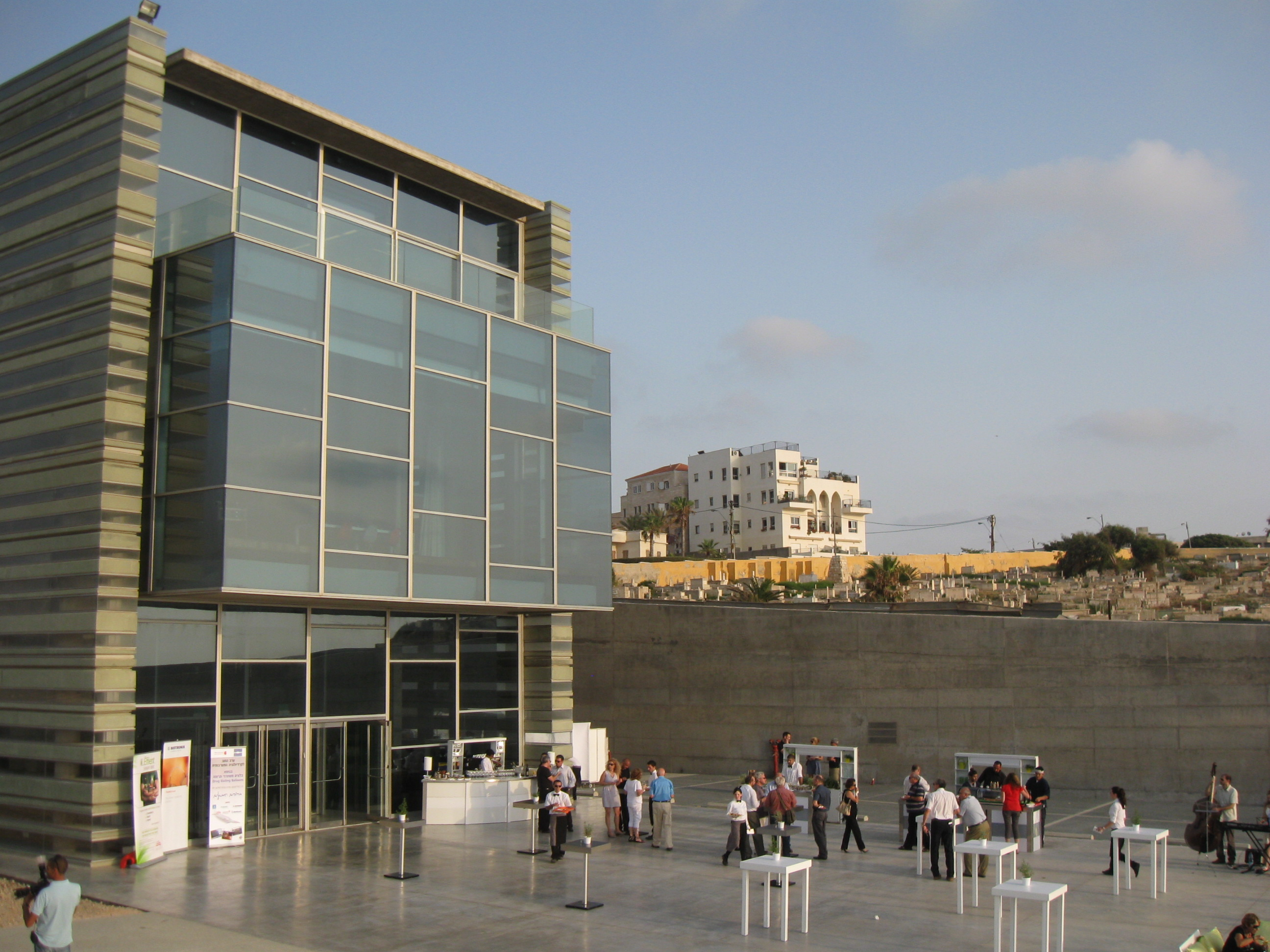
- Founded: 1996
- Founder: Shimon Peres
- Type: NGO
- Purpose: Health and medicine; Sports; Agriculture; Environment; Business; Education; Youth; Technology; Arts
- Location: Tel Aviv-Jaffa, Israel
- Region served: Israel; Palestinian territories; Middle East
- Method: Dialogue; People-to-people interaction; Capacity building; Youth cooperation; Business and economic cooperation; Humanitarian response
- Employees: 35
- Volunteers: 5
- Website: www.peres-center.org

The Peres Center for Peace and Innovation, located in Jaffa, Israel, is an independent non-profit, non-governmental, and non-political organization founded in 1996 by Nobel Peace Laureate and former President of Israel Shimon Peres. Its aim is to further Peres' vision of people in the Middle East working together to build peace through socio-economic cooperation and development and people-to-people interaction.

== Mission ==
The Peres Center for Peace and Innovation describes its mission as "promot[ing] lasting peace and advancement in the Middle East by fostering tolerance, economic and technological development, innovation, cooperation and well-being – all in the spirit of President Peres’ vision."

== Activities ==
The peacebuilding activities of the Peres Center fall into the following fields: Agriculture and Water; Business and Economics; Civil Leadership; Community Programs in Jaffa; Culture, Media and Arts, Medicine and Healthcare; Social Media and Information Technology (IT); and Sport.

=== Agriculture, water and the environment ===
Implementing programs that facilitate cross-border research, capacity building and cooperation in order to enhance crop management practices, environmental protection, and water quality. Projects include cross-border pest management, aquaculture, crop production workshops, regional water research, joint olive oil production and more.

=== Business and economics ===
Providing space for interaction between stakeholders on both sides through joint economic research (in partnership with the AIX Group), capacity-building workshops and professional networking to foster cross-border cooperation across a wide range of business fields including hi-tech, confectionery, food, textile and shoe-making and more.
Projects include private sector partnerships, regional economic research, cross-border tourism projects, technology projects, and the creation of a Palestinian business directory.

=== Civic leadership ===
Designing and implementing programs that engage Israeli and Palestinian civil society and community leaders, creating a strong cross-border network while providing enrichment and professional training. Programs generate dialogue channels between Palestinians and Israelis and between Jews and Arabs within Israel across professional fields.
Projects include international youth exchanges, a leadership program for young politicians and forums for public debate.

=== Culture, media and the arts ===
Delivering theater, photography and arts programs that bring together Palestinian, Israeli, Jewish and Arab adults, youth and children.
Projects include a cross-border photojournalist program, an arts program for children, and a play that expounds messages of coexistence in schools.

=== Medicine and health ===
In cooperation with the Israeli medical community, assisting in the creation of an independent Palestinian medical system through human resource development, advancement of complex medical services and cross-border cooperation and knowledge transfer, as well as providing humanitarian medical aid to Palestinian babies and children.
Projects include a program that allows for the treatment of Palestinian babies in Israeli hospitals and a program for training Palestinian doctors.

=== Social media and technology ===
Designing programs that enable the people of the Middle East, particularly young people, to engage in virtual dialogue with each other.
Projects include a popular Facebook group, dialogue curricula for school groups through computer centers and a diplomacy-based game.

=== Sports ===
The Twinned Peace Sports Schools bring together Israeli, Palestinian, Jewish and Arab boys and girls to play together through sports. These include football, basketball, wheelchair basketball, cricket, table tennis and Australian football.

== Awards and recognition ==
- United Nations Gold Award (Blood Relations Campaign)
- 2010 Wingate Award for Best NGO in the Field of Peace and Sport
- Ashoka Entrepreneurship Award
- 2010 Peace and Sports Award (Monaco) for Best NGO
- 2010 Global Sports Forum Barcelona award for Best Project
- 2010 - Emilio Ambasz Prize for Green Architecture
- Yesodot Ha'emek Prize for Israeli Architecture.

== Peres Peace House ==
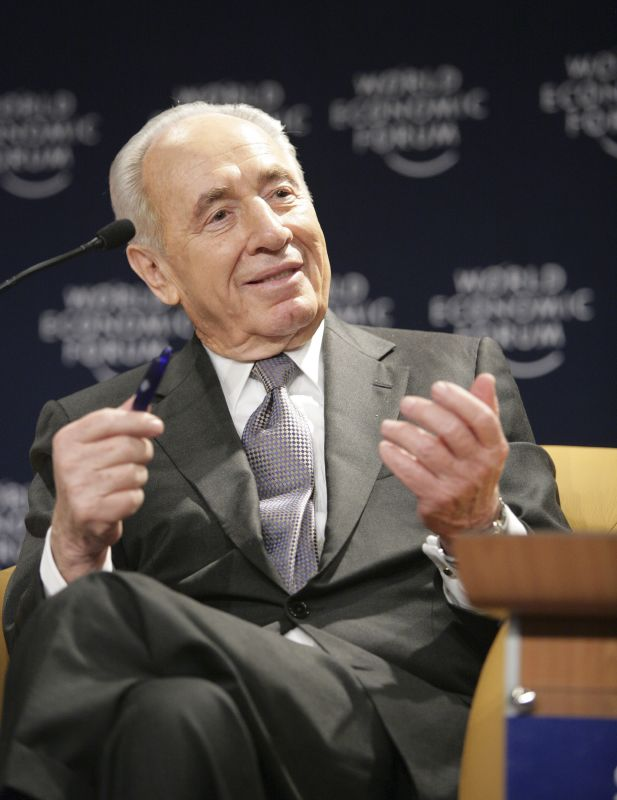
Shimon Peres in 2007

Since December 2009, the offices of the Peres Center for Peace and Innovation are housed in the Peres Peace House in Ajami, a largely Arab neighborhood of Jaffa.

The Peres Peace House also contains the Shimon Peres Archives, an auditorium and conference rooms, and a conflict resolution library. Many of the Peres Center's activities, including public lectures and coexistence activities, take place within the Peres Peace House, as well as activities for the empowerment and development of the local Jaffa communities. These include legal aid services, community empowerment programs and a mentoring program for underprivileged children.

The cost of the center was estimated at $6 million and timeline of three years. According to Haaretz, as of August 2009, the cost and building time of the Peace House have been highly underestimated. The center was opened in December 2009. The building (2,500 sq m), a distinctive architectural landmark on the Jaffa coast next to the poor Arab neighborhood of Ajami, was designed by renowned Italian architect Massimiliano Fuksas.

Through the years the building was open to the use of the local Arab community and the Center promoted projects to empower local groups and individuals. The first event held at the building was a graduation ceremony of 21 women, mostly Arab who graduated from a Women's Economic Empowerment Program and received their computer technician certificates.

== Leadership ==
The Director General of the center is Efrat Duvdevani, formerly Director General of the President's House during Peres' Presidency. Her predecessor was Ido Sharir, formerly Chief of Staff to President Peres. Before Mr. Sharir, Ron Pundak served as Director General for over 10 years. The men and women who comprise the executive board are CEOs, Directors, and Presidents of various organizations, as well as scholars, academics, and journalists. The first Director General of the Peres Center was Ambassador Uri Savir, who, together with Shimon Peres, established the organization and currently serves as Honorary President.

== Reception ==
Over the years the Center has won both negative and positive critiques. Author Witt Raczka questioned the efficacy of the organization.

== Controversy ==
=== Tax-exempt status ===
The Israel Tax Authority denied the Peres Center's request for tax-exempt status in Israel. According to Haaretz, after the Center applied for the tax-exempt status the Tax Authority demanded that the organization stop funding the training of the physicians from the Gaza Strip in Israeli hospitals. The demand led the organization to suspend its application rather than stop the project.

In 2016 the Peres Center received tax-exempt status in Israel. The Peres Center for Peace and Innovation also has tax-exempt status in the United States, the United Kingdom, and Italy.

== See also ==
- Arab–Israeli peace-orientated projects
- Neve Shalom – Wāħat as-Salām
- Alliance for Middle East Peace
- Oslo Accords
- Peace One Day
- Shimon Peres
- Valley of Peace initiative
- Architecture of Israel
