= Gilad Shalit prisoner exchange =

2011 deal between Israel and Hamas

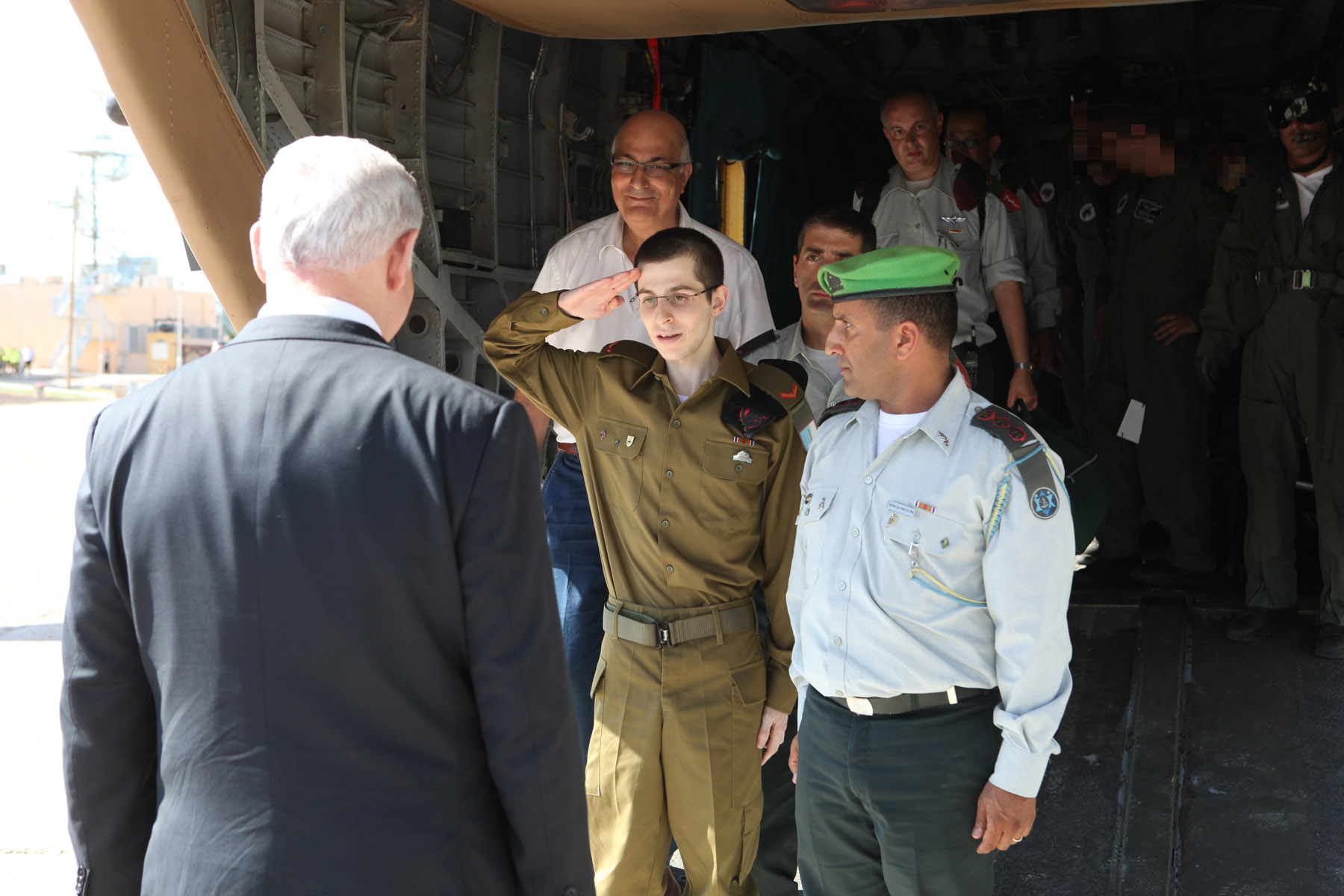
Israeli Prime Minister Benjamin Netanyahu welcoming Israel Defense Forces soldier Gilad Shalit at Tel Nof after his release from Hamas captivity

Following a 2011 agreement between Israel and Hamas, Israeli soldier Gilad Shalit was released in exchange for 1027 prisoners — almost all Palestinians and Arab-Israelis, although there were also a Ukrainian, a Jordanian and a Syrian. Of these, 280 had been sentenced to life in prison for, according to Israeli authorities, planning and perpetrating various attacks against Israeli targets. Many of the other Palestinians were held under "administrative detention" – which allows Israel to hold Palestinians indefinitely without charging them with any crime.

The deal, brokered by Mossad official David Meidan through a secret back channel run by Gershon Baskin and Hamas Deputy Foreign Minister Ghazi Hamad, was authorized by Israeli Prime Minister Benjamin Netanyahu on one side and Ahmed Jabari, head of Izz ad-Din al-Qassam Brigades on the other side. The list of prisoners to be released (based on previous work conducted by German and Egyptian mediators and coordinated by Bundesnachrichtendienst agent Gerhard Conrad), was signed in Egypt on 11 October 2011. Its first phase was executed on 18 October 2011, with Israel releasing 477 Palestinian prisoners and Hamas transferring Shalit to Cairo. In the second phase, which took place during December 2011, another 550 prisoners were released.

The agreement is, to date, the largest prisoner exchange agreement Israel has ever made and the highest price Israel has ever paid for a single soldier. Gilad Shalit was also the first captured Israeli soldier to be released alive in 26 years.

== Background ==
=== 2006 Gaza cross-border raid ===
On Sunday morning, 25 June 2006, at about 5:30 a.m. (GMT+2) an armed squad of Palestinian special units from the Gaza Strip crossed the border into Israel via a 300-metre-long (980-foot) tunnel they dug near the Kerem Shalom border crossing. After crossing the border via the tunnel, the militants, backed by mortar and anti-tank fire from within the Gaza Strip, split into three groups to attack a watch tower, an empty armored personnel carrier, and a Merkava Mark III tank. The militants managed to blow open the tank's rear doors with a rocket-propelled grenade fired from point-blank range and afterwards tossed hand grenades inside the tank. Two crew members were killed by the grenades, another team member was seriously wounded, while the fourth team member, Corporal Gilad Shalit, was taken from the tank at gunpoint. Immediately afterward, the Palestinian militant squad made their way back into the Gaza Strip with Shalit through the tunnel after they blew an opening in the security fence; thus Shalit became the first Israeli soldier captured by Palestinians since the kidnapping and murder of Nachshon Wachsman in 1994.

Meanwhile, large Israeli military forces arrived at the site and began helping the wounded. When they reached the tank the military forces discovered the two bodies. When it became clear that there was only one wounded person in the tank and that the fourth crew member was missing, an abduction alert was declared and various Israeli troops entered Gaza.

Shalit's captors held him in a secret location in the Gaza Strip for a total of 1,934 days leading up to the prisoner swap deal. While in captivity, Hamas refused to allow the International Red Cross access to Shalit, and the only indications that he was still alive were an audio tape, a video recording, and three letters. Hamas said Shalit received medical care, was not physically abused, and allowed to watch TV.

=== Rescue attempt ===
Israeli forces entered Khan Yunis on 28 June 2006 to search for Shalit. According to an Israeli embassy spokesman, "Israel did everything it could in exhausting all diplomatic options and gave Mahmoud Abbas the opportunity to return the abducted Israeli... This operation can be terminated immediately, conditioned on the release of Gilad Shalit." On the same day, four Israeli Air Force aircraft flew over Syrian President Bashar al-Assad's palace in Latakia, as an IDF spokesperson said that Israel views the Syrian leadership as a sponsor of Hamas. The operation did not succeed in finding Shalit.

=== Negotiations for release ===
Unofficial talks between Israel and Hamas began on 1 July 2006, six days after the abduction of Shalit, mediated by Gershon Baskin, an Israeli peace activist, co-director of the Israeli-Palestinian think tank IPCRI—the Israel Palestine Center for Research and Information. On that day, Baskin arranged a telephone conversation between Hamas Government spokesman Ghazi Hamad and Noam Shalit, the father of the soldier. Baskin made contact with Prime Minister Ehud Olmert and informed him of this contact with Hamas.

On 9 September 2006, Baskin arranged for a hand written letter from Shalit to be delivered to the Representative Office of Egypt in Gaza, the first sign of life from Shalit and the proof of an actual channel of communication had been established. But later that day, Olmert's representative, Ofer Deckel told Baskin that he had to step down from his efforts because the Egyptian intelligence was taking over. Deckel had been appointed by Olmert 50 days after Shalit's abduction. In the end of December 2006 the Egyptians presented the agreed formula for a prisoner exchange in which Israel would release 1000 Palestinian prisoners in exchange for Shalit in two phases. This was the same agreement reached five years later.

After Olmert resigned from office on corruption charges and following elections in Israel which brought Netanyahu to power, Deckel was replaced by former Mossad agent Hagai Hadas who worked primarily though the good offices of a German Intelligence Officer, Gerhard Conrad. Hadas resigned in failure in April 2011 and was replaced by Mossad Officer David Meidan. Meidan took over on 18 April 2011, he was contacted by Gershon Baskin the very same day. The secret back channel run by Baskin and Hamas Deputy Foreign Minister Ghazi Hamad was authorized by Netanyahu in May 2011.

Netanyahu responded to a pilgrimage march, called by Shalit's father for his release, by saying he was willing to release 1000 Palestinian prisoners in exchange for Shalit, but that top Hamas leaders would not be among those released. Shalit's father had previously blamed the US for blocking talks on his son's release.

The Baskin–Hamad secret back channel produced a document of principles for the release on 14 July 2011 which was authorized by Prime Minister Netanyahu and Ahmad Jabri. In August 2011, Egyptian-moderated negotiations on determining the list of names of the prisoners to be released began with Hamas represented by Ahmed Jabari and three other Hamas officials and Israel represented by David Meidan and two other Israeli officials. Haaretz reported that Israel proposed a prisoner swap, and threatened that if Hamas rejected the proposal, no swap would occur. Hamas responded by warning that an end to negotiations would lead to Shalit's "disappearance". Negotiations were hung up over disagreements between the two parties regarding Israel's unwillingness to release all of the so-called "senior prisoners" into the West Bank—a demand Hamas rejected—and regarding the particulars of releasing prisoners who were leaders of Hamas and other organizations.

=== The approval of the agreement ===
On 11 October 2011, the pan-Arab Al Arabiya network reported that Israel and Hamas had reached an agreement on Gilad Shalit. Netanyahu convened a special Cabinet meeting to approve the Shalit deal. The deal was brokered by German and Egyptian mediators and signed in Cairo. It stipulated the release of Gilad Shalit in exchange for 1027 Israeli-held security prisoners; 280 of these served life sentences for planning and perpetrating various terror attacks against Israeli targets. The military Hamas leader Ahmed Jabari was quoted in the Saudi Arabian newspaper Al-Hayat as confirming that the prisoners released as part of the deal were collectively responsible for 569 deaths of Israeli civilians. Gerald Steinberg, political science professor at Bar-Ilan University and president of NGO Monitor, said that the goal of Israel allowing the Egyptians to take an active part was "to help stabilize [Cairo], so they play a constructive role in the region. It's to show to other countries" as well, that Egypt is a "counterweight" to Turkey, with Israel showing preference to Egypt.

Shortly after Benjamin Netanyahu announced that an agreement had been reached, the Israeli Cabinet convened in an emergency session to vote on the deal. Twenty-six ministers voted in favor of the deal while three voted against it—Foreign Minister Avigdor Lieberman, Minister of Strategic Affairs Moshe Ya'alon, and Minister of National Infrastructure Uzi Landau. Ya'alon (Likud) argued that the prisoners would "go back to terrorism" and that they would destabilize the security situation in the West Bank. Landau (Yisrael Beiteinu) warned that the deal would be "a huge victory for terror" and that it would encourage more abductions of Israelis.

On 15 October the Israeli Justice Ministry published the list of the 477 prisoners that Israel intends to release as part of the first phase of the agreement.

=== Controversy among the Israeli public ===
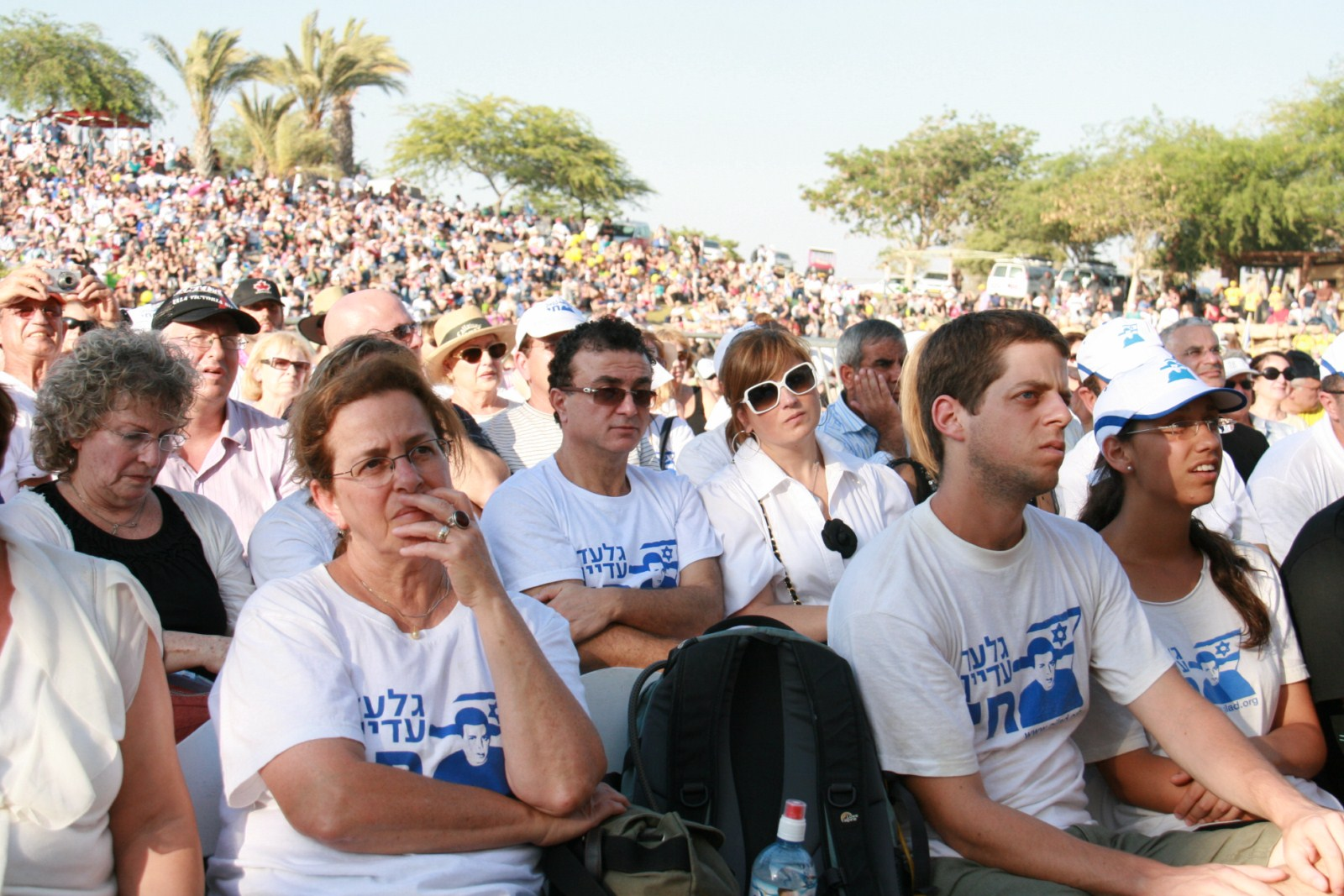
Shalit's mother and brother at IPO solidarity concert

During the time period in which Shalit was in captivity, the Shalit issue became a highly debated and controversial matter within the Israeli public. Following the calls from terror victims' widows in 2009 to release the killers of their loved ones in exchange for Shalit, Ze'ev Rapp, the father of the late Helena Rapp, publicly expressed his strong objection:

"Those who support this move don't understand the grief they're causing us. The memory of our loved ones cries out from beneath the earth for revenge. Blood is pouring from our heart and soul; stop bringing up these "bleeding hearts" ideas. [...] Stop drinking our blood!"

The Israeli press also extensively debated this issue. Israeli analyst Dan Schueftan has called the possible swap deal "the greatest significant victory for terrorism that Israel has made possible since its establishment". Daniel Bar-Tal, a professor of political psychology at Tel Aviv University, said

"Here we see the basic dilemmas between the individual and the collective, and we see victim pitted against victim. Gilad Shalit is a victim who was violently kidnapped, in a way that Israelis do not consider to be a normative means of struggle. Therefore, one side says, he should be returned at any price. But the families of those killed in terrorist attacks and the people who were wounded in those attacks are victims, too, and they say that no price should be paid to the murderers. And it is truly a dilemma, because no side is right, and no side is wrong."

Others believe that the disagreement among Israelis represents rifts and changes within Israeli society. Attorney Dalia Gavriely-Nur, a lecturer at Bar-Ilan University, says that the camp opposing the prisoners deal is holding onto a view of society, in which the individual was expected to sacrifice himself for the good of society; the camp supporting the prisoner release is expressing a shift to a more privatized society.

The debate over this issue was also reflected amongst others in the Israeli cabinet meeting in which the agreement was approved, after being supported by 26 ministers and opposed by three ministers—Avigdor Lieberman, Moshe Ya'alon, and Uzi Landau who said "... this deal is a triumph for terror and [is] detrimental to Israel's security and deterrence".

== Implementation of the Gilad Shalit prisoner exchange ==
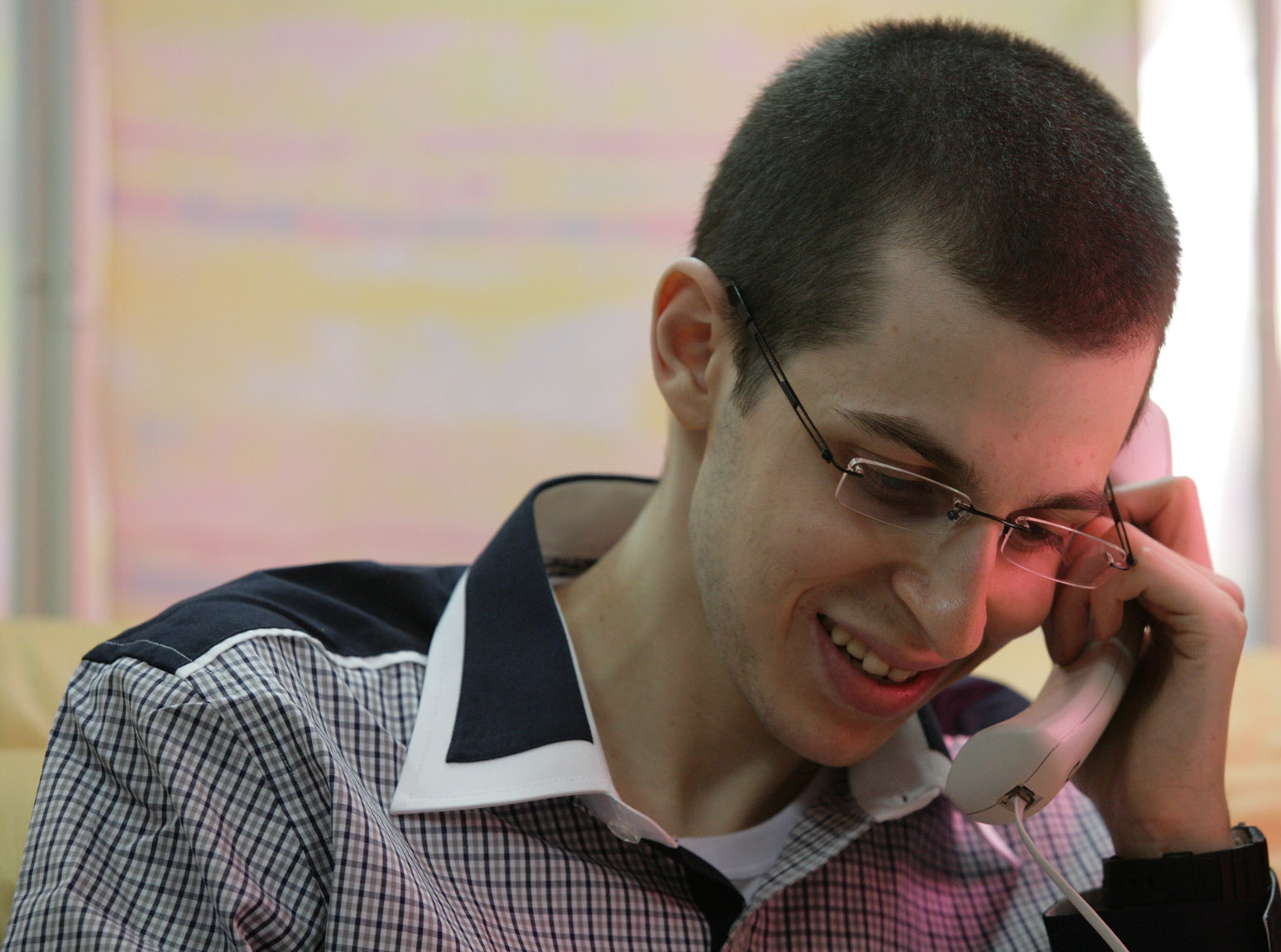
Gilad Shalit at IDF base Amitai near Kerem Shalom, on the phone with his parents, 18 October 2011

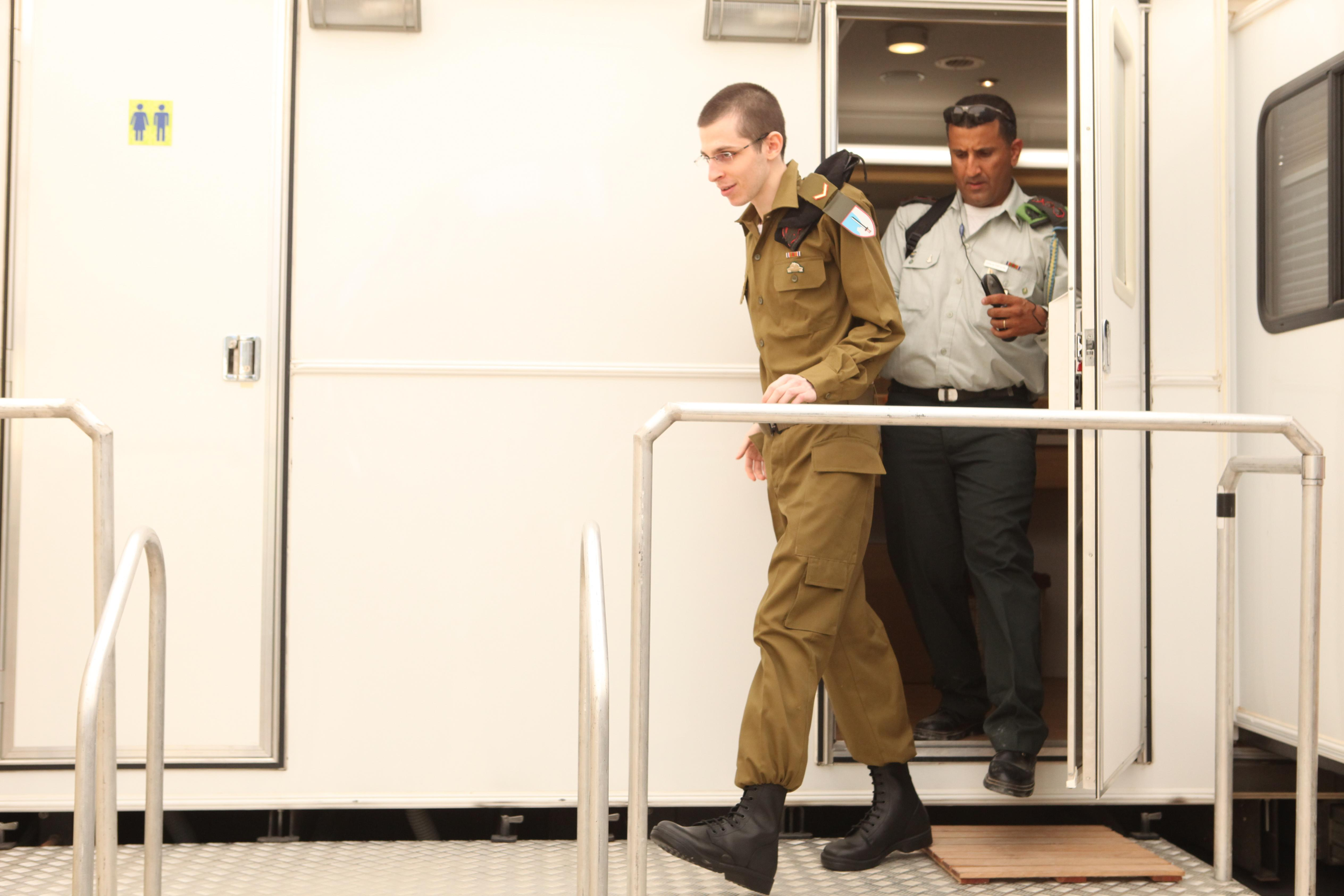
Shalit, soon after arriving Kerem Shalom, Israel, 18 October 2011

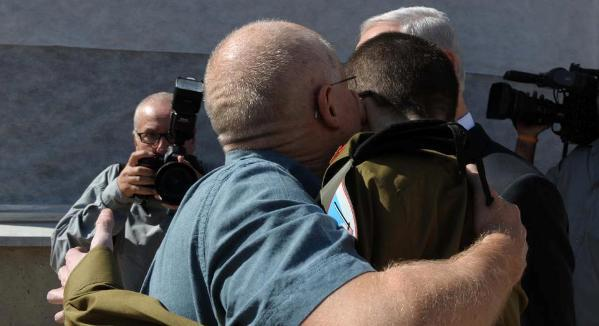
Shalit meets his father for the first time in five years, 18 October 2011

The agreement was implemented in two stages:

- In the first stage, Gilad Shalit was transferred from the Gaza Strip to Egypt and from there to Israel; concurrently, Israel released 477 prisoners.
- In the second stage, which took place two months later, another 550 prisoners were released.

=== First phase ===
Of the first 450, 131 were released to Gaza, while 110 returned to their homes in the West Bank. Six Israeli Palestinians were also released. The remaining 203 prisoners were deported, with 40 barred from Israel and Palestine.

On 18 October, the first group of Palestinian prisoners were transported to Egypt. From there, they will go to the West Bank and Gaza Strip. On the same day, Shalit was taken from Gaza to Egypt and from there to Israel. Shalit was given a medical evaluation and was said to be in good health, although pale and thin. Shalit changed into a military uniform and traveled by helicopter to the Tel Nof Airbase, where he met with his family and Prime Minister Benjamin Netanyahu. At Shalit's release Hamas had several militants with suicide belts in case the Israelis attempted to renege on the deal at the last minute.

On the day of the release of Gilad Shalit, immediately after he was transferred to the Red Cross, Israel released 27 prisoners (most of whom would be allowed to return to East Jerusalem and the West Bank and two of them would be deported abroad). Afterwards the rest of the prisoners were transferred in buses to the West Bank. Those that were expelled to Gaza or abroad, were transferred first to Cairo.

==== Egyptian state television interview ====
Immediately following Hamas's release of Shalit, he was interviewed on the Egyptian state-owned television channel Nile TV by anchorwoman Shahira Amin. Generating a storm of criticism in Israel, the interview was considered insensitive and exploitative. An Israeli official stated, "We are all shocked that a so-called interview was forced on (Shalit) before he could even talk to his family or set foot on Israeli soil." Egyptian officials, however, claimed that the interview went according to agreements between Israel, Egypt and Hamas, and that Israel knew about it in advance.

During the interview, Shalit appeared uncomfortable and struggled to speak at points while breathing heavily. It later emerged that Hamas militants were still in the room with Shalit as the interview was set up. Israeli media accused Egypt of using the interview to advance Egyptian and pro-Palestinian positions, with the interviewer attempting to prompt Shalit to praise Egypt for its role in arranging the exchange as well as call for the release of all Palestinian prisoners. Israeli journalist Oren Kessler said the interview was not only exploitative but "amateurish, propagandistic, opportunistic, and downright cruel."

==== Prominent prisoners released as part of the deal ====
Among the 1,027 prisoners released are about 280 prisoners serving life sentences for planning and perpetrating terror attacks including:

- Zaher Jabarin, who assumed leadership of Hamas' Financial Bureau and became the Hamas leader in the West Bank after the death of Saleh al-Arouri in 2024
- Husam Badran, now Hamas spokesman in Qatar.
- Walid Abd al-Aziz Abd al-Hadi Anajas (36 life sentences) – took part in the execution of the Café Moment bombing (2002), the Hebrew University bombing (2002) and the Sheffield Club bombing (2002).
- Nasir Sami Abd al-Razzaq Ali al-Nasser Yataima (29 life sentences) – convicted of planning the Passover massacre (2002) in which 30 civilians were killed and 140 were wounded.
- Maedh Waal Taleb Abu Sharakh (19 life sentences), Majdi Muhammad Ahmed Amr (19 life sentences) and Fadi Muhammad Ibrahim al-Jaaba (18 life sentences) – responsible for the attack on bus No. 37 in Haifa in 2002.
- Ahlam Tamimi (16 life sentences) – Assisted in the execution of the Sbarro restaurant suicide bombing (2001).
- Abd al-Hadi Rafa Ghanim (16 life sentences) – the surviving perpetrator of the Tel Aviv–Jerusalem bus 405 suicide attack in which Ghanim seized the steering wheel of a crowded Egged commuter bus line No. 405 and managed to pull the bus into a ravine in the area of Qiryat Ye'arim. 16 civilians were killed in the attack.
- Muhammad Waal Muhammad Douglas (15 life sentences) – took part in the execution of the Sbarro restaurant suicide bombing in Jerusalem (2001).
- Muhammad Taher Mahmud al-Qaram (15 life sentences) – directly involved in the planning and execution of a bus attack in Haifa in which 15 Israelis were killed.
- Ahmed Mustafa Saleh Hamed al-Najar (7 life sentences) – led a militant squad that killed 3 Israelis in shooting attacks.
- Yahya Sinwar (4 life sentences) – took part in the kidnapping of two Israeli soldiers in 1989 and was sentenced to life in prison. Founder of the Hamas security apparatus in Gaza. His brother organized the abduction of Gilad Shalit in 2006.
- Abd-Al-Aziz Muhammad Amar (4 life sentences) – took part in the execution of the Café Hillel bombing (2003).
- Ibrahim Sulaim Mahmud Shammasina (3 life sentences) – took part in the killing of the boys Ronen Kramni and Lior Tuboul, the taxi driver Rafi Doron and the soldier Yehushua Friedberg.
- Amir Sa'ud Salih Abu Sarhan (3 life sentences) – killed three Israelis with a knife in 1990.
- Mahmud Muhammad Ahmed Atwan (3 life sentences), Musa Daud Muhammad Akari (3 life sentences), and Majid Hassan Rajab Abu Qatish (3 life sentences) – militants that killed the Israeli policeman Nissim Toledano in 1992.
- Muhammad Yussuf Hassan al-Sharatha (3 life sentences) – head of the militant squad that kidnapped and killed the Israeli soldiers Ilan Saadon and Avi Sasportas during the First Intifada.
- Abd al-Aziz Yussuf Mustafa Salehi (1 life sentence) – participant in the 2000 Ramallah lynching who was iconically photographed displaying his blood-stained hands to the Palestinian mob after having beaten an Israeli soldier to death.
- Bassam Ibrahim Abd al-Qader Abu Asneina (1 life sentence) and Riyadh Zakariya Khalil Asayla (1 life sentences) – Killed the yeshiva student Chaim Kerman.
- Fahed Sabri Barhan al-Shaludi (1 life sentence) – took part in the kidnapping and killing of the Israeli soldier Yaron Chen.
- Fuad Muhammad Abdulhadi Amrin (1 life sentence) – killed 15-year-old Israeli schoolgirl Helena Rapp in 1992.
- Jihad Muhammad Shaker Yaghmur (1 life sentence) – took part in the killing of Nachshon Wachsman.
- Mona Jaud Awana (1 life sentence) – lured over the Internet the 16-year-old Israeli high school student Ofir Rahum, pretending to be a young American tourist, managed to drive him to a remote area in the outskirts of Ramallah where three Palestinian gunmen showed up and shot Rahum at close range.
- Muhammad Abdul-Rahman Muhammad Zakut (1 life sentence) – Tel Aviv construction worker who stabbed three Israelis, killing two, on the holiday of Purim, 21 March 1989.
- Tarek Ahmed Abd al-Karim Hasayin (1 life sentence) – carried out the shooting attack on Highway 6 in June 2003, in which the 7-year-old girl Noam Leibowitz was killed.
- Yussuf Dhib Hamed Abu Aadi (1 life sentence) – Convicted of stabbing Israeli soldier Nir Kahana in 2005.
- Sh'hadeh Muhammad Hussein Sana'a (1 life sentence) – participated in the King George Street bombing by leading the suicide bomber to his destination.
- Abdallah Nasser Mahmud Arar (1 life sentence) – Member of the Hamas cell responsible for kidnapping and killing Israeli businessman Sasson Nuriel in 2005.
- Ahmed Jibril Othman al-Takruri (1 life sentence) – Carried out a firebomb attack on a bus in Jericho, in which a mother and her three children, and a soldier who tried to rescue them, were murdered.
- Alaa al-Din Radha al-Bazyan (1 life sentence) – Convicted of perpetrating sniper attacks and belonging to a terrorist group.
- Ali Muhammad Ali al-Qadhi (1 life sentence) – Member of a Hamas cell responsible for kidnapping and killing Israeli businessman Sasson Nuriel in 2005.
- Bushra al-Tawil (16 months) – Palestinian photojournalist. She was rearrested in 2014 and had to serve the remainder of her imprisonment.

=== Second phase ===
During the second phase of the swap deal, and according to the agreement, Israel alone determined the list of the prisoners to be released (albeit in consultation with Egypt). The released prisoners included 300 Fatah members, 50 Popular Front members, and 20 members of the Democratic Front. The remaining 657 had no political affiliation.

Egypt asked Israel to include an additional nine female Palestinian prisoners who had not been released during the first phase. Israel ultimately released six. Hours before the release, clashes broke outside of Israeli Ofer prison between Israeli security forces and the families of the prisoners who were expected to be released in the swap deal. The late hour of the release was cited, which families claimed would prevent holding festivities, as well as the fact that many prisoners were expected to be released soon anyway - 300 were supposed to be released within a year.

Netanyahu was placed under pressure by President Mahmoud Abbas to release Fatah prisoners during the deal's second phase, as in the first phase Hamas prisoners were released instead. Abbas argued that a promise to do so was given to him by former Prime Minister Ehud Olmert.

According to the Israeli criteria, the prisoners that were released in the second phase of the swap deal are ones who are defined as not having "blood on their hands". Even after the completion of the swap deal, Hamas declared that it would continue to kidnap Israeli soldiers until all Palestinian prisoners serving time in Israeli prisons were released.

=== Prominent prisoners Israel refused to release ===
The exchange is also remembered for the well-known prisoners that Israel refused to release, including:

- Marwan Barghouti, convicted of 5 counts of murder: authorizing and organizing the murder of Georgios Tsibouktzakis, a shooting adjacent to Giv'at Ze'ev in which a civilian was killed, and the Seafood Market attack in Tel Aviv in which 3 civilians inside Israel were killed.
- Ahmad Sa'adat, Secretary-General of the militant Popular Front for the Liberation of Palestine.
- Ibrahim Hamed, a commander of Hamas terrorist bombings and suicide bombings.

== Public reactions following approval of the agreement ==
=== Israel ===
According to a 2011 poll reported by the Israeli newspaper Yedioth Ahronoth, 79% of the Israeli people supported the exchange, while 14% opposed it.

Almagor, an Israeli organization representing victims of attacks, criticized the Shalit deal as "a victory for terror and Hamas." According to its figures, terrorists freed in past prisoner exchanges cost 180 Israelis their lives. On 14 October, the memorial to Prime Minister Yitzhak Rabin in Tel Aviv was defaced with graffiti, with the words "Free Yigal Amir" and "Price Tag" spray-painted on to the memorial. The perpetrator, Shvuel Schijveschuurder of Giv'at Shmuel, was arrested shortly afterward. Schijveschuurder's parents and three siblings were killed in the Sbarro restaurant suicide bombing, and he had vandalized the memorial out of anger that two prisoners involved in the Sbarro attack were included in the swap deal. His sister Leah later told media that the family was seriously considering leaving for the Netherlands, where their parents immigrated from.

Commentator Nahum Barnea of Yedioth Aharonoth said that under the circumstances, considering that the alternative may have been to let Shalit die in captivity, the deal was unavoidable, despite its attendant security risks.

=== Palestine ===
Reactions to the swap deal in the Gaza Strip were positive in general, with some convinced Hamas could have achieved a better deal from its perspective. Shawan Jabrin, general director of Palestinian human rights organization Al Haq, said that the deportation of some prisoners to other countries "goes against the Geneva Conventions" and is part of an Israeli scheme to drive Palestinians out of the area.

Huge crowds turned out to welcome the released prisoners in Gaza, chanting demands for militants to seize more Israeli soldiers.

Following her release, Ahlam Tamimi gave an interview which was later posted on the Internet (as translated by MEMRI) in which she stated:

I do not regret what happened. Absolutely not. This is the path. I dedicated myself to Jihad for the sake of Allah, and Allah granted me success. You know how many casualties there were [in the 2001 attack on the Sbarro pizzeria]. This was made possible by Allah. Do you want me to denounce what I did? That's out of the question. I would do it again today, and in the same manner.

In a public address delivered by Khalil Al-Khayeh, a member of the Hamas Gaza leadership, which aired on Al-Aqsa TV on 19 October 2011 (as translated by MEMRI), Al-Khayeh praised some of the released prisoners. Al-Khayeh praised Amir Sa'ud Salih Abu Sarhan and Ashraf Ba'louja for "stabbing the enemies of Allah" and Khalil Abu 'Elba who "drives a car, and crushes the enemies of Allah." He also praised Abd al-Hadi Rafa Ghanim for "divert[ing] a bus from its course and into a ravine near Jerusalem." He further added that "we mustn't forget the Knives Revolution... Our brothers Abd Al-Rahman Al-Dib and Khaled Al-Jei'di... In these streets, they would bring the Jews down, one after the other."

In 2012, Hamas celebrated the anniversary of Gilad Shalit's release with a week of celebrations, and vowed to capture more Israeli soldiers.

== Official reactions ==
=== Involved parties ===
Israel:

- Prime Minister Benjamin Netanyahu said the deal struck "the right balance" between Israeli security risks and the imperative of returning Shalit "to his family and people." In a televised address from Tel Nof Airbase, Netanyahu stated, "Today we are all united in joy and in pain."
- President Shimon Peres thanked Netanyahu for what he called the prime minister's "brave decision" and said it was a time to embrace the families who lost their loved ones in terrorist attacks.
- Opposition leader Tzipi Livni said she respected the government's decision and sent her blessings to the Shalit family and to all of Israel.
- Israeli chief rabbis Shlomo Amar and Yona Metzger released a joint statement welcoming the deal.

Palestine:

- Palestinian president Mahmoud Abbas expressed support for the deal and said efforts would continue to secure the release of the remaining prisoners being held in Israel. Foreign Minister Riyad al-Maliki questioned the timing of the swap deal, implying it may have been intended to marginalize the role of the Palestinian Authority and Abbas.
- Hamas leader Khaled Mashal hailed the deal as a victory for the Palestinian people.
- Abu Obaida, the spokesman of Hamas' armed wing, the Izz ad-Din al-Qassam Brigades, said in a televised statement in Gaza that "We will not give up until prisons are shut down. A chapter has ended but there are other chapters."

=== Intergovernmental organizations ===
- UN Secretary-General Ban Ki-moon described the prisoner exchange deal as a "significant humanitarian breakthrough" and expressed hope that the event would have a far-reaching and positive impact on the stalled Middle East peace process.
- A spokesman for the Office of the United Nations High Commissioner for Human Rights expressed the office's concern that shipping prisoners abroad is in breach of international law.
- Quartet on the Middle East representative Tony Blair said the return of Gilad Shalit was "a moment of great joy" for Gilad Shalit and his family as well as the Palestinian prisoners released in the swap deal and their families. Blair also said that he hopes the prisoner swap deal "is a moment of opportunity—not only for Gaza—but also a regaining and revival of credibility in the peace process".

=== International ===
- United States –
  - President Barack Obama and Secretary of State Hillary Clinton welcomed the release of Shalit and, saying he was imprisoned for "far too long".
  - White House Press Secretary Jay Carney stated that "We are pleased by the reports that Mr. Shalit will be home soon with his family. The president, as you know, has called many times for his release, and that his release is long overdue."
- United Kingdom – Foreign Secretary William Hague welcomed the agreement and expressed a hope that Shalit would be reunited with his family "as soon as possible."
- France – President Nicolas Sarkozy warmly welcomed the agreement to free Shalit and thanked Egypt for its role in the negotiations.
- Germany – Germany, which played a leading role in the prisoner swap negotiations, expressed its support for the deal.
- Russia – The Foreign Ministry published a statement saying, "The exchange gives reasons to expect that the parties will mange [sic] to make progress in the settlement of other sensitive issues".
- Turkey – Foreign Minister Ahmet Davutoğlu welcomed Gilad's release and stated that Turkey was happy to see Gilad Shalit going free. Turkey along with Egypt and Germany had played a key role in Shalit's release.
- Iran – Foreign Ministry spokesman Ramin Mehmanparast stated that Tehran congratulates the Palestinian nation on its "victory" in the release of Palestinian prisoners.

== Subsequent events ==
On 18 October 2011, the family of Solomon Liebman, who was killed in a shooting attack 13 years earlier, announced a potential financial reward of $100,000 for anyone who killed the two murderers of Solomon Liebman (Khuwailid Ramadan and Nizar Ramadan) who were released in the Gilad Shalit prisoner exchange deal. In response to this statement, on 25 October 2011 the Saudi cleric and preacher Sheik Awadh al-Qarani offered a financial reward of $100,000 for anyone who managed to kidnap an Israeli soldier to be replaced with more Palestinian prisoners. On 29 October 2011, the Saudi royal Prince Khaled bin Talal stated that he has decided to show solidarity with al-Qarani offering a financial reward of $900,000 to those who would manage to kidnap more Israeli soldiers, thus making the total financial reward stand at a $1 million. On 8 February 2012, it was reported that Iman Sharona, one of the militants freed in the exchange, had been re-arrested by Israeli authorities after allegedly continuing to perform terrorist activities.

=== Released prisoners engaged in new attacks ===
In October 2012, data was released indicating dozens of the released Palestinian prisoners in the Gilad Shalit prisoner exchange had resumed paramilitary activity. Many of them joined the leadership of Hamas, and other Palestinian prisoners developed weapons and fired rockets at Israeli population centers, and some recruited members to new guerrilla cells in the West Bank. One of these cells in Hebron allegedly planted a bomb and plotted to kidnap an Israeli soldier. Released prisoners in the West Bank have also engaged in violent activity, and Israeli authorities arrested 40 of them for rioting, hurling Molotov cocktails, handling funding for terrorism, and other acts.

In 2014, the IDF launched Operation Brother's Keeper in response to the disappearance of three Israelis in the West Bank. Part of the operation included rearresting some of the Palestinians released under the Gilad Shalit prisoner exchange.

In July 2015, Israeli news sources calculated that six Israelis had been killed in incidents involving prisoners released under the Shalit deal who had returned to militant activity. Malachi Rosenfeld was murdered in the 2015 Shvut Rachel shooting directed by released prisoner Ahmed Najar. Another released prisoner, Asama Asad, was complicit in the murder of Danny Gonen.

The October 7 attacks was planned and arranged by Yahya Sinwar (who was freed in the prisoner exchange) among others also freed. The attack resulted in the death of 1,180 people (including 797 civilians), while 3,400 were wounded and 251 taken captive.

== See also ==
- Israeli–Palestinian conflict
- Pidyon Shvuyim
- Jibril Agreement
- Elhanan Tannenbaum
- 2008 Israel–Hezbollah prisoner exchange
- List of Arab–Israeli prisoner exchanges
- List of prisoners released by Israel in the Gilad Shalit prisoner exchange
- David Meidan
- Hostage diplomacy
