= Zaha Hassan =

Palestinian human rights lawyer, political analyst, activist, researcher and writer

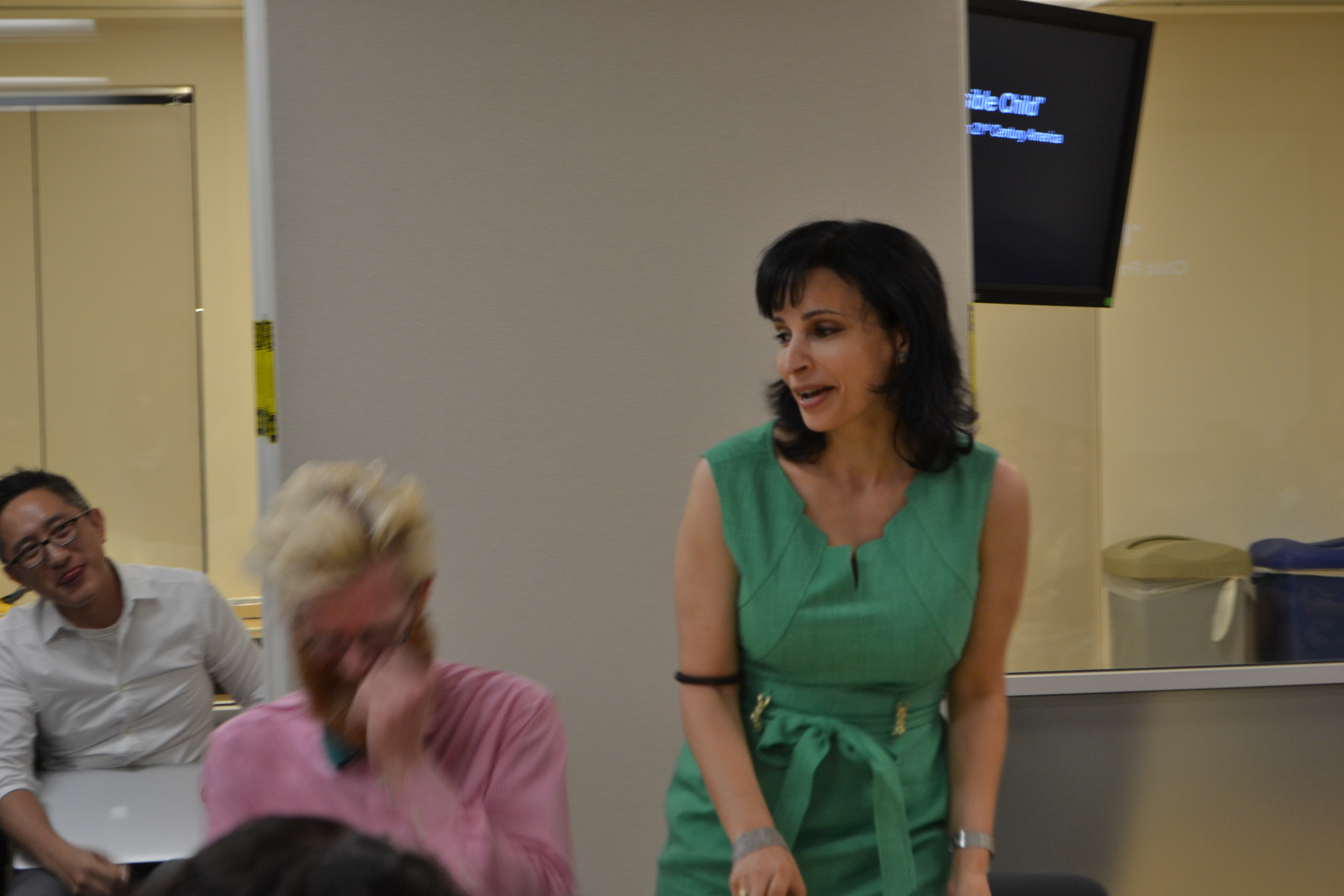
- Hassan in 2015

Visiting Fellow at the Carnegie Endowment for International Peace, New America Foundation, and Middle East Program
- In office ?–?

Personal details
- Citizenship: American
- Education: Willamette University; University of Washington; Willamette University College of Law
- Occupation: Human rights lawyer, political analyst, activist, researcher, writer

Zaha Hassan (Arabic: زها حسن) is a Palestinian human rights lawyer, political analyst, activist, researcher and writer. She advocates for human rights in the State of Palestine and also advocates for peace between Israel and State of Palestine. She is a visiting fellow at the Carnegie Endowment for International Peace, New America Foundation and Middle East Program. She currently lives in Washington D.C., United States.

== Career ==
Zaha obtained her BA in Political Science and Near East Languages and Civilisations from the University of Washington. She received J. D. from the University of California and obtained LLM in Transnational and International Law from the Willamette University College of Law.

She is known for her extensive research work on Politics of Palestine, Israel-Palestine relations and peace among them. She has also focused her research work about the use of international legal mechanisms by the political movements and the United States foreign policy in the Israeli-Palestinian region. She had also served as a coordinator and senior legal advisor to the Palestinian negotiating team between 2010 and 2012 especially when government of Palestine bid to obtain membership in the United Nations. She also served as an integral member of the Palestinian delegation in exploratory talks between 2011 and 2012 which was sponsored by Quarter. She often engages in track II peace talks and efforts.

She is also a member of the Palestinian Policy Network, Al Shabaka and also serves as a board member of BuildPalestine which is a global community of supporters passionate about the social impact in Palestine. She has also appeared as political analyst and commentator in exclusive debate shows broadcast and published by Al Jazeera, CNN, New York Times, Detroit News, Salon and The Oregonian. In addition, she also occasionally contributes to Israeli newspapers Hill and Ha'aretz.

Hassan is also an activist who suggested new ideas and to formulate new strategies and approaches in order to de-escalate and solve the tensions between Israel and Palestine which erupted again in early May 2021.

== See also ==
- Rula Hassanein
- Bushra al-Tawil
