= Sheffield bombing =

Sheffield bombing may refer to:

- The Sheffield Blitz, 1940–41 — bombing raids by Nazi Germany against the city of Sheffield during World War II, resulting in more than 660 civilian deaths.
- The Sheffield Club bombing, 2002 — a suicide bombing carried out by Hamas against a nightclub in Rishon LeZion, Israel, killing 16 people.
