= Malki Foundation =

Israeli charity

- Named after: Malka Chana (Malki) Roth
- Founded: 2001
- Founder: Frimet and Arnold Roth
- Type: Philanthropic organization
- Headquarters: Jerusalem, Israel
- Key people: Debbie Fishman
- Website: kerenmalki.org

The Malki Foundation (Hebrew: קרן מלכי, romanized: Keren Malki) is an Israeli charity organization based in Jerusalem that supports families of children with disabilities.

== History ==
The Malki Foundation was founded in 2001 by the family of Malka Chana (Malki) Roth, who was killed at the age of 15 in the Sbarro restaurant suicide bombing. Two days before, she had returned from a summer camp for disabled children where she volunteered as a guide. The foundation exists as a memorial to her life. Her younger sister was also disabled.

In 2003, the Malki Foundation signed a partnership with the social welfare organization Kesher.

In 2016, the foundation supported the parliamentarian Karine Elharrar in her campaign to eradicate Israel's special needs schools and integrate less able children into the country's mainstream school system.

Families with disabled children have a difficult time finding equipment and services outside of an institution. The foundation's assistance allows families to keep their child at home with other siblings and the parents. All services and equipment are provided at no cost to the families. People of all religions and backgrounds are eligible for assistance.

The foundation gets 35% of its funding from US donors, 5% from UK donors, 20% from Israeli donors, 16% from Australian donors, and 24% from global events. 49% of its budget is dedicated to fund therapies at home (2017). 82 children received the foundation's support for therapy at home from June 2016 to June 2017.
