= Sbarro restaurant suicide bombing =

2001 Palestinian attack in West Jerusalem

- Part of the Second Intifada militancy campaign
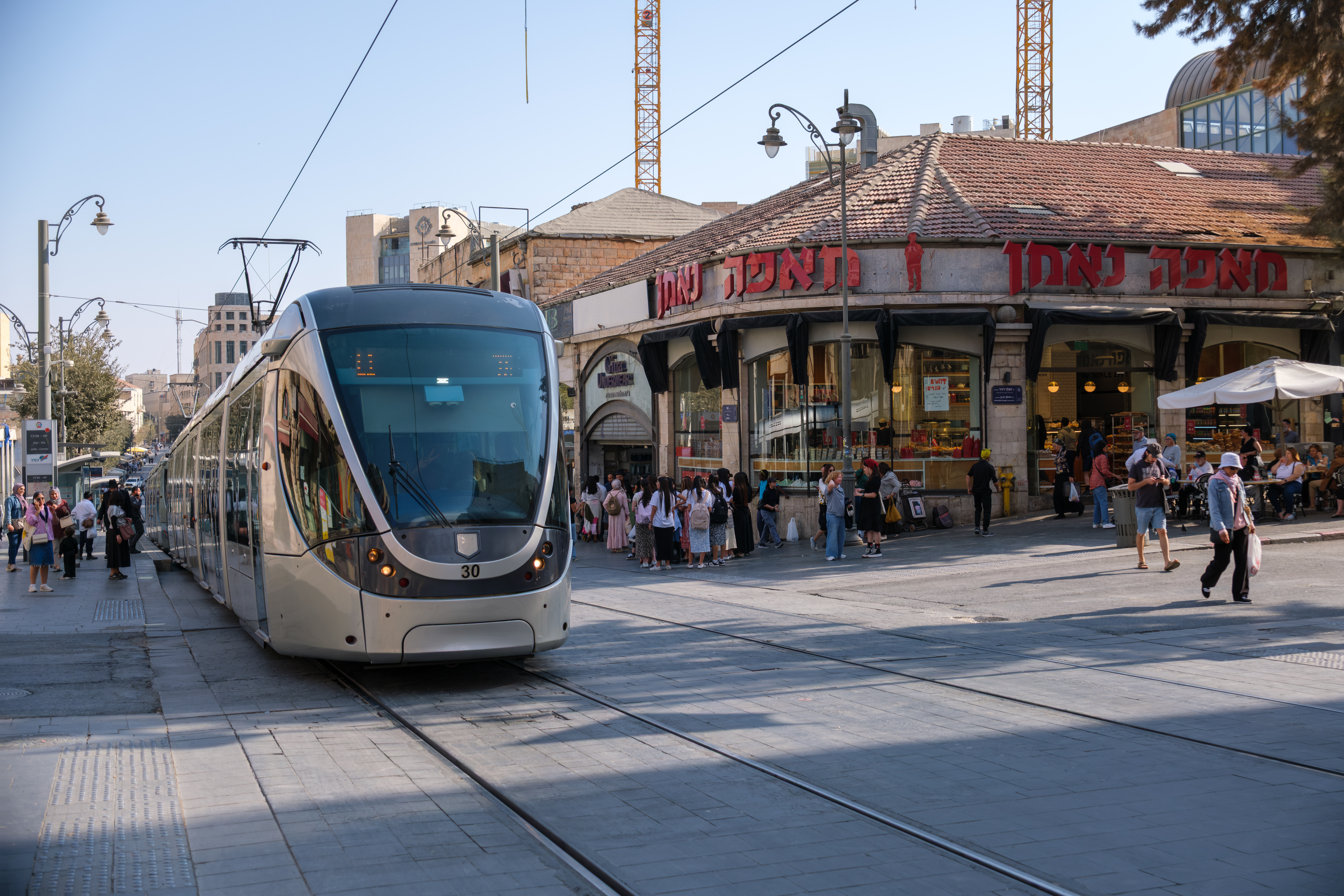
- The Intersection of King George Street and Jaffa Road, as it appeared in November 2025

- The attack site Sbarro restaurant suicide bombing (Jerusalem District) Sbarro restaurant suicide bombing (Israel)
- Location: 31.7830°N 35.2179°E; Jerusalem
- Date: 9 August 2001; 2:00 pm (IDT)
- Target: Israeli visitors of the Sbarro pizza restaurant
- Attack type: Suicide bombing
- Deaths: 16 civilians (+1 bomber)
- Injuries: 140
- Perpetrator: Hamas

A Palestinian suicide bombing at a pizzeria in downtown Jerusalem on 9 August 2001 killed 16 people, including seven children and a pregnant woman. A further 130 were wounded. The attack occurred during the Second Intifada.

== Attack ==
At the time of the bombing, the Jerusalem branch of the Sbarro pizza restaurant chain was located at the corner of King George Street and Jaffa Road in Jerusalem, one of the busiest pedestrian crossings in the region. Although not required to do so, owner Noam Amar added extra support columns on the advice of city inspectors.

Ahlam Tamimi, who was charged as an accomplice, scouted for a target before leading Izz al-Din Shuheil al-Masri, the suicide bomber, to the Sbarro restaurant. They arrived just before 2:00 p.m., when the restaurant was filled with customers, "dozens of women, children and babies", and pedestrian traffic outside was at its peak. Tamimi departed before Al-Masri, thought to be carrying a rigged guitar case or wearing an explosive belt weighing five to 10 kilograms, containing explosives, nails, nuts and bolts, detonated his bomb.

Chaviv Avrahami, who saw the scene of the attack after the bombing, recounted: "I heard a tremendous explosion, and I was thrown up a metre into the air. I knew immediately that it was a bomb attack, and a catastrophic one. There were people – babies – thrown through the window and covered with blood. The whole street was covered with blood and bodies: the dead and the dying." Naor Shara, a soldier who witnessed the attack, said, "The worst thing I saw, which I think will haunt me all my life, is a baby that was sitting in a stroller outside a shop and was dead. After the explosion, the baby's mother came out of the store and started screaming hysterically."

== Casualties ==
The dead included 14 Israelis, one pregnant American, and one Brazilian. Additionally, 130 were injured. One victim, Chana Nachenberg, remained hospitalized in a persistent vegetative state for more than 20 years after the attack, until her death from her injuries on 31 May 2023. She was 31-years-old at the time of the bombing. Her daughter, who was two years old at the time, was one of the few in the restaurant who was not injured.

Yocheved Shoshan, 10, was killed, and her 15-year-old sister Miriam was severely injured with 60 nails lodged in her body, a hole in her right thigh, third degree burns on 40 percent of her body, and a ruptured spleen.

Mordechai and Tzira Schijveschuurder, both children of Holocaust survivors, were killed along with three of their children. Two other daughters, Leah, 11, and Chaya, 8, were critically injured. The family was of Dutch origin.

== Perpetrators ==
Izz al-Din Shuheil al-Masri, the perpetrator of the bombing. His bandana says "Al Qassam Brigades" (Arabic: كتائب القسام, romanized: Kataeb Al Qassam), the militant wing of the Hamas movement.

Both Hamas and the Islamic Jihad Movement in Palestine initially claimed responsibility, with Hamas saying that the attack was in response to Israel's assassination ten days earlier in Nablus of the two leading Hamas commanders Jamal Mansour and Omar Mansour as well as six civilians including two children.

The suicide bomber who died in the course of carrying out the attack was later identified to be Izz al-Din Shuheil al-Masri (Arabic: عز الدين شهيل المصري) from the Palestinian West Bank town of Aqabah. Izz al-Masri was 22 at the time and the son of a successful restaurant owner, and from an affluent land-owning family.

The person who constructed the explosives was Abdallah Barghouti. For his part in the bombing and a string of other attacks, in which 67 civilians were killed and 500 injured, he received 67 life sentences on 30 November 2004.

=== Ahlam Tamimi ===
Izz al-Masri was escorted to the restaurant by Ahlam Tamimi, a 20-year-old female university student and part-time journalist, who had disguised herself as a Jewish tourist for the occasion. She later commented that she was not sorry for what she had done and does not recognize Israel's existence. "Despite the fact that I'm sentenced to 16 life sentences I know that we will become free from Israeli occupation and then I will also be free from the prison," she said. When she first learned from a journalist who was interviewing her in jail that she had murdered eight children, not just three as she had initially believed, she just smiled broadly and continued with the interview.

Tamimi was released in October 2011 in exchange for the release of captive Israeli soldier Gilad Shalit.

== Aftermath ==
In response to the attack, Israel shut down the unofficial Palestinian "foreign office" in Jerusalem, at the Orient House.

In 2001, the family of Malka Chana (Malki) Roth, a 15-year-old victim of the attack, founded The Malki Foundation, a charity organization that supports families of children with disabilities. All services and equipment are provided at no cost to the families and people of all religions and backgrounds are eligible for assistance. Her parents, Arnold and Frimet Roth, participated in a mass protest in Europe alongside the families of other terror victims in support of the legality the Israeli West Bank barrier. Arnold remarked, "Do I feel bad about the destruction the fence is causing? I do. But do not compare the murder of my daughter to the inability of a Palestinian to get to work by 9:00 A.M."

The incident inspired the Belzberg family to establish the ONE Family Fund, a charity that provides assistance to victims of terrorist attacks targeting Israel. The husband of Shoshana Greenbaum, the pregnant woman killed in the attack, organized a group called "Partners in Kindness" and writing a column called "A Daily Dose of Kindness". He explained that he made these efforts in attempt to "improve the world".

After the suicide bombing, Palestinian university students at the An-Najah University in the West Bank city of Nablus created an exhibition celebrating the first anniversary of the Second Intifada. The exhibit's main attraction was a room-sized re-enactment of the bombing at Sbarro. The installation featured broken furniture splattered with fake blood and human body parts. The entrance to the exhibition was illustrated with a mural depicting the bombing. The exhibit was later shut down by Palestinian leader Yasser Arafat.

== Reactions ==
Foreign Minister Peres said that "If the Palestinian Authority had acted with the necessary determination and carried out preventive detentions of Hamas terrorists and their operators, the murders today in Jerusalem would have been prevented."

Within the Palestinian Territories, Hamas claimed responsibility for the bombing which it praised as a "retaliation of the Palestinian people" against Israel. President of the Palestine Liberation Organization and of the Palestinian Authority Yasser Arafat condemned the "bombing attack ... in West Jerusalem and I denounce all acts that harm civilians." but the Palestinian Authority blamed Israeli prime minister Ariel Sharon for provoking the attack and stated it held him "fully responsible for what happened. The assassinations, the killings and the terrorism that he has practised and escalated in recent weeks led to this result." The following day, the PA claimed that they had arrested two people "in connection with the Sbarro bombing".

U.S. President George W. Bush expressed condolences and stated, "I deplore and strongly condemn the terrorist bombing in downtown Jerusalem today. My heartfelt sympathies and those of the American people are with the victims of this terrible tragedy and their families." Bush demanded Arafat to "condemn this horrific terrorist attack, act now to arrest and bring to justice those responsible, and take immediate, sustained action to prevent future terrorist attacks."

According to the U.N. press release, UN Secretary-General Kofi Annan strongly condemns today’s suicide bomb attack in the city of Netanya in Israel in which at least 15 Israeli citizens were killed and many others wounded. He reiterates his conviction that such terrorist attacks are morally repugnant and immensely harmful to the Palestinian cause. He extends his heartfelt condolences to the Government of Israel and to the families of the victims of this attack." He "[urged] all sides to exercise maximum restraint and not to allow the enemies of peace to derail the current efforts to secure a durable ceasefire and to implement the Tenet and Mitchell plans." According to the Belgian EU Presidency, "The Presidency of the European Union unreservedly condemns the bombing of a Jerusalem shopping centre today, 9 August. It abhors this cowardly act which mainly claimed the lives of innocent civilians."

In November 2024, the Jerusalem District Court ruled that the Palestinian Authority must compensate the victims of the Sbarro restaurant bombing; the compensation is estimated to total millions of shekels.

=== 2011 prisoner exchange ===
During the 2011 Gilad Shalit prisoner exchange, relatives of the victims of the bombing vehemently protested the release of Ahlam Tamimi, who chose the Sbarro restaurant as a target and drove the bomber to the location.

Arnold and Frimet Roth circulated a petition against Tamimi's inclusion in the Gilad Shalit prisoner exchange and also wrote a letter to Prime Minister Binyamin Netanyahu urging him to exclude her from the list. Frimet Roth said in October, "We feel desperate. We beg Mr. Netanyahu to grant us a few minutes of his time and hear us out. In any sane country with a fair judicial system, even paroled murderers are not released without granting the victims' loved ones a chance to address the parole board."

Chaya Schijveschuurder, whose parents and three siblings were killed in the attack, protested with a sign that read, "My parents' blood screams from the grave!" Her brother, Shvuel, vandalized the Yitzhak Rabin memorial and commented, "My opinions are all right compared to [Chaya's] and compared to how she feels about the deal. She was badly wounded in the [Sbarro] attack, she feels that releasing the terrorist is as if she were raped and then the rapist went and murdered her parents and is now being released. For her it's like being raped twice."

== See also ==
- Israeli casualties of war
- List of massacres in Israel
- List of Palestinian suicide attacks
- Malki Foundation
- Palestinian political violence
