= Ahlam Tamimi =

Jordanian woman known for role in 2001 bombing in Jerusalem

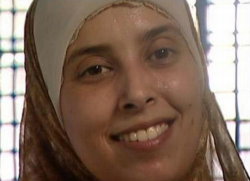
- Picture of al-Tamimi
- Born: 1980 (age 45–46); Zarqa, Jordan
- Spouse: Nizar Tamimi

Ahlam Aref Ahmad al-Tamimi (Arabic: أحلام عرف أحمد التميمي; born 1980) is a Jordanian national known for assisting in carrying out the Sbarro restaurant suicide bombing in Jerusalem, in 2001. She was convicted by an Israeli military tribunal and received multiple life sentences, but was released in 2011 as part of the Gilad Shalit prisoner exchange and exiled to Jordan. She hosts a television show about Palestinians in Israeli prisons.

== Background ==
Al-Tamimi was born in Zarqa, Jordan.

Tamimi was a journalism student at Birzeit University in the West Bank. Her brother Mohamed speculates that her fluency in English and the fact that she did not wear a headscarf made her less suspicious to Israeli officials.

Tamimi originates from Nabi Salih, a Palestinian village in the central West Bank. Ben Ehrenreich of The New York Times said that she was "much-loved in Nabi Saleh".

== Earlier bombing ==
Tamimi placed an explosive device at a grocery store in Jerusalem in July 2001, which exploded, but did not cause damage.

== Sbarro restaurant suicide bombing ==
Tamimi helped plan and participated in the Sbarro restaurant suicide bombing, which caused 145 casualties, including 16 fatalities, half of them children. She was 20 years old at the time, and still in university. After driving and dropping off the suicide bomber at his target, she reported on the bombing on a Palestinian news channel.

=== The attack ===
On 9 August 2001, Tamimi escorted suicide bomber Izz al-Din Shuheil al-Masri (Arabic: عز الدين شهيل المصري) to the Sbarro restaurant. She used disguise techniques to deflect attention from herself and al-Masri, wearing a dress that made her appear more like a "Jewish tourist" than an Arab, and using language skills gained in her journalism studies. While al-Masri died in the attack as intended, Tamimi left the area before the bomb detonated.

She then had a second role reporting on the attack in the press, in her part-time journalism job.

=== Public and personal reaction ===
In an interview which aired on Al-Aqsa TV on 12 July 2012 (as translated by MEMRI), Tamimi described the reaction of other Palestinians immediately after the bombing:

Afterwards, when I took the bus, the Palestinians around Damascus Gate [in Jerusalem] were all smiling. You could sense that everybody was happy. When I got on the bus, nobody knew that it was me who had led [the suicide bomber to the target]... I was feeling quite strange, because I had left [the bomber] 'Izz Al-Din behind, but inside the bus, they were all congratulating one another. They didn't even know one another, yet they were exchanging greetings...While I was sitting on the bus, the driver turned on the radio. But first, let me tell you about the gradual rise in the number of casualties. While I was on the bus and everybody was congratulating one another...

After hearing an initial report that "three people were killed" in the bombing, Tamimi stated:

I admit that I was a bit disappointed, because I had hoped for a larger toll. Yet when they said "three dead," I said: 'Allah be praised'...Two minutes later, they said on the radio that the number had increased to five. I wanted to hide my smile, but I just couldn't. Allah be praised, it was great. As the number of dead kept increasing, the passengers were applauding.

Frimet Roth, the mother of one of Tamimi's murder victims, has criticized her release. She said when Tamimi was released along with hundreds of other convicted murderers in exchange for a single Israeli soldier, it felt as if her daughter was murdered all over again.

=== Lack of remorse ===
In subsequent interviews, Tamimi commented that she was not sorry for what she had done, and does not recognize Israel's existence. "Despite the fact that I'm sentenced to 16 life sentences, I know that we will become free from Israeli occupation and then I will also be free from the prison," she said. Reportedly, when she first learned from a journalist who was interviewing her in prison that she had murdered eight children, not just three as she had initially believed, she just smiled broadly and continued with the interview.

Following her release from prison (see below), Tamimi gave an interview with the Jordanian Ammon News website, which was later posted on YouTube (as translated by MEMRI):

I do not regret what happened. Absolutely not. This is the path. I dedicated myself to Jihad for the sake of Allah, and Allah granted me success. You know how many casualties there were [in the 2001 attack on the Sbarro pizzeria]. This was made possible by Allah. Do you want me to denounce what I did? That's out of the question. I would do it again today, and in the same manner.

She has also expressed satisfaction at the sizable death count, including those of the children, and her earlier disappointment when initial reports stated lower counts.

=== Life sentences and release ===
She was imprisoned for her role in the events and was sentenced by a military tribunal at the Ofer Prison, to 16 consecutive life sentences and an additional 15 years in prison. She was released in an October 2011 prisoner swap for captive Israeli soldier Gilad Shalit.

== Later activities ==
During her time in the prison, she married her cousin Nizar, who was being held in a separate prison. She moved to Jordan immediately after her release. Her arrival there was attended by hundreds of people, including relatives, many Muslim Brotherhood supporters, and trade unionists and citizens. She later met with Hamas leader Khaled Mashal in Cairo, Egypt.

Tamimi hosts a Jordanian talk show, Nasim Al-Ahrar (Breeze of the Free), on the Hamas-affiliated Al-Quds TV. It deals with Palestinian prisoners in Israeli prisons.

In an interview with Al-Jazeera, Tamini claimed that Israel had asked the "Russian mafia" to kill her and other Palestinian prisoners who were released in the Gilad Shalit prisoner exchange agreement, although she did not provide further details.

== American legal proceedings ==
On 15 July 2013, the U.S. Justice Department filed criminal charges in the District of Columbia against Tamimi for conspiring to use a weapon of mass destruction against U.S. nationals outside the U.S., resulting in death. The criminal complaint was unsealed on 14 March 2017. Jordanian courts ruled that Tamimi could not be extradited, as the Jordanian parliament has not ratified the extradition treaty with the United States yet.

The extradition treaty was first negotiated for the purpose of arresting Eyad Ismoil, a Jordanian citizen who assisted in the bombing of the World Trade Center in 1993 and bringing him back from Jordan to the US. The extradition treaty was signed by Jordan's King Hussein in 1995 and Ismoil was arrested and handed over to the US later that year.

According to one account of Ismoil's extradition, the turning over of a Jordanian citizen over to the US on Jordanian soil was a "political hand grenade" which led to the Jordanian Parliament scrapping the treaty a week later.

There is a $5 million reward for Tamimi's capture.

Tamimi is the first Islamic terrorist from the Arab League to face criminal prosecution in the United States and marks a stark about-face from American foreign policy under previous administrations.

In October 2020, Jordan refused to renew Nizar's residency permit and asked him to leave within 48 hours. He currently resides in Qatar. There was speculation about Ahlam joining him there, since there is no extradition treaty between the U.S. and Qatar.

In March 2021, Interpol dropped its arrest warrant for Tamimi.

In 2025, the Jordanian government began negotiations to possibly extradite Tamimi to the US in return for the resumption of financial aid, which had been suspended as part of the second Trump administration's wider freeze of USAID.
