= Sbarro =

American pizzeria chain

Sbarro, LLC
- Sbarro logo used since 2015
- Type: Private
- Industry: Restaurant
- Genre: Italian-American cuisine Pizzeria
- Founded: 1956; 70 years ago Brooklyn, New York, U.S.
- Founders: Gennaro Sbarro; Carmela Sbarro
- Headquarters: Columbus, Ohio, U.S.
- Number of locations: 600+
- Area served: United States (incl. Guam); Argentina; Aruba; Bolivia; British Virgin Islands; Canada (Alberta, Ontario); Chile; Colombia; Egypt; Georgia; Iceland; India; Mexico; Paraguay; Philippines; Poland; Saudi Arabia; Turkey; Uruguay; United Kingdom
- Key people: J. David Karam (CEO and President)
- Products: Pizza, pasta, salads
- Revenue: US$257 million (US, 2024, est.)
- Website: sbarro.com

Sbarro, LLC (/səˈbɑːroʊ/ sə-BAR-oh; stylized in all caps) is an American fast food restaurant that specializes in New York–style pizza sold by the slice and other Italian-American cuisine. In 2011, the company was ranked 15th in foreign sales among U.S.-based quick-serve and fast-casual companies by QSR Magazine. In 2008, Sbarro was rated the No. 1 Quick Service Restaurant in the Italian segment by Entrepreneur magazine. Sbarro has over 600 locations in 28 countries. Sbarro stores are located in shopping malls, department stores, airports, service areas, and college campuses, as well as in the Pentagon, American naval bases, and casinos.

== History ==
=== 20th century ===
Sbarro was founded in 1956 by Gennaro and Carmela Sbarro. The couple and their three sons, Joseph, Mario, and Anthony, immigrated to America from Naples, Italy. Its original location closed in 2004.

In 1970, Sbarro opened its first mall-based restaurant in Brooklyn's Kings Plaza Shopping Center. One of their busiest outlets was one of two which were both located in the World Trade Center, with the busiest in the mall underneath the complex, while the other was at the observation deck on the South Tower. However, both outlets were destroyed during the September 11 attacks in 2001.

The first Sbarro in the Philippines was opened in 1990. As of 2023, the country had 56 stores.

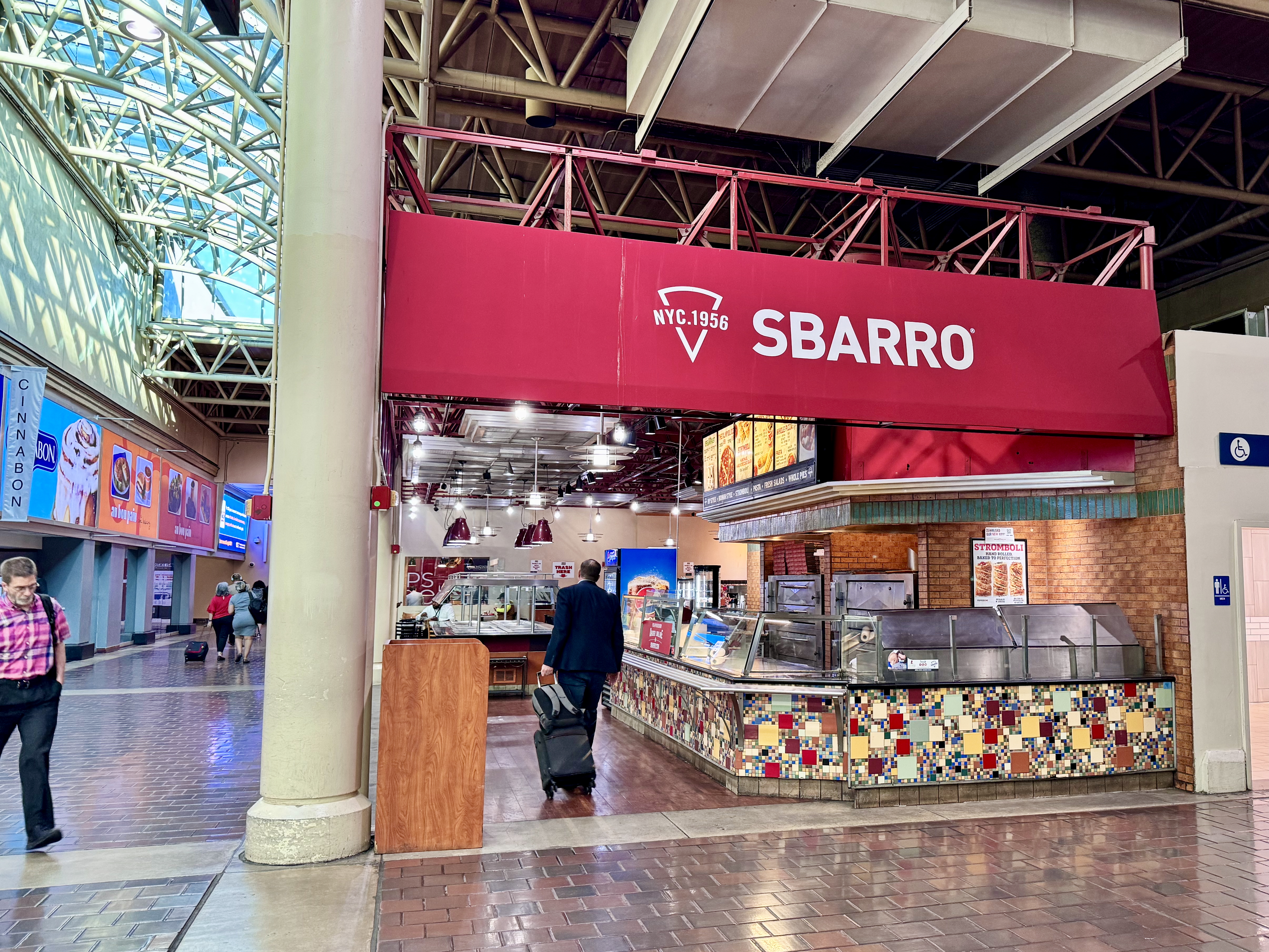
A Sbarro restaurant at Union Station in Washington, D.C.

=== 21st century ===
On August 9th 2001, 16 people were killed and 130 wounded in Sbarro Restaurant Suicide Bombing in Jerusalem.

In early 2007, Sbarro was acquired by MidOcean Partners, a private equity firm with offices in New York and London.

Other vertically aligned logo variant

Distribution of Sbarro restaurants around the world Countries with current Sbarro locations Countries with former Sbarro locations

The company filed for Chapter 11 bankruptcy protection on April 4, 2011. At the time it was ranked by Pizza Today as the country's fifth-largest pizza chain. It was the third-largest pizza chain to declare bankruptcy in less than a year. Earlier, Round Table Pizza (ranked no. 10) and Uno Chicago Grill (ranked no. 11), through its parent Uno Restaurant Holdings, filed bankruptcy. Uno has since emerged.

In November 2011, Sbarro was granted court approval to emerge from bankruptcy under a plan requiring restructuring and ceding ownership to lenders; 25 sites were closed. In January 2012, James J. Greco was brought in as CEO of Sbarro to implement a turnaround plan as the company emerged from bankruptcy. Sbarro rebranded, updating its pizza recipe, food offerings, and branding, and bringing fresh ingredients back to the forefront of the menu.

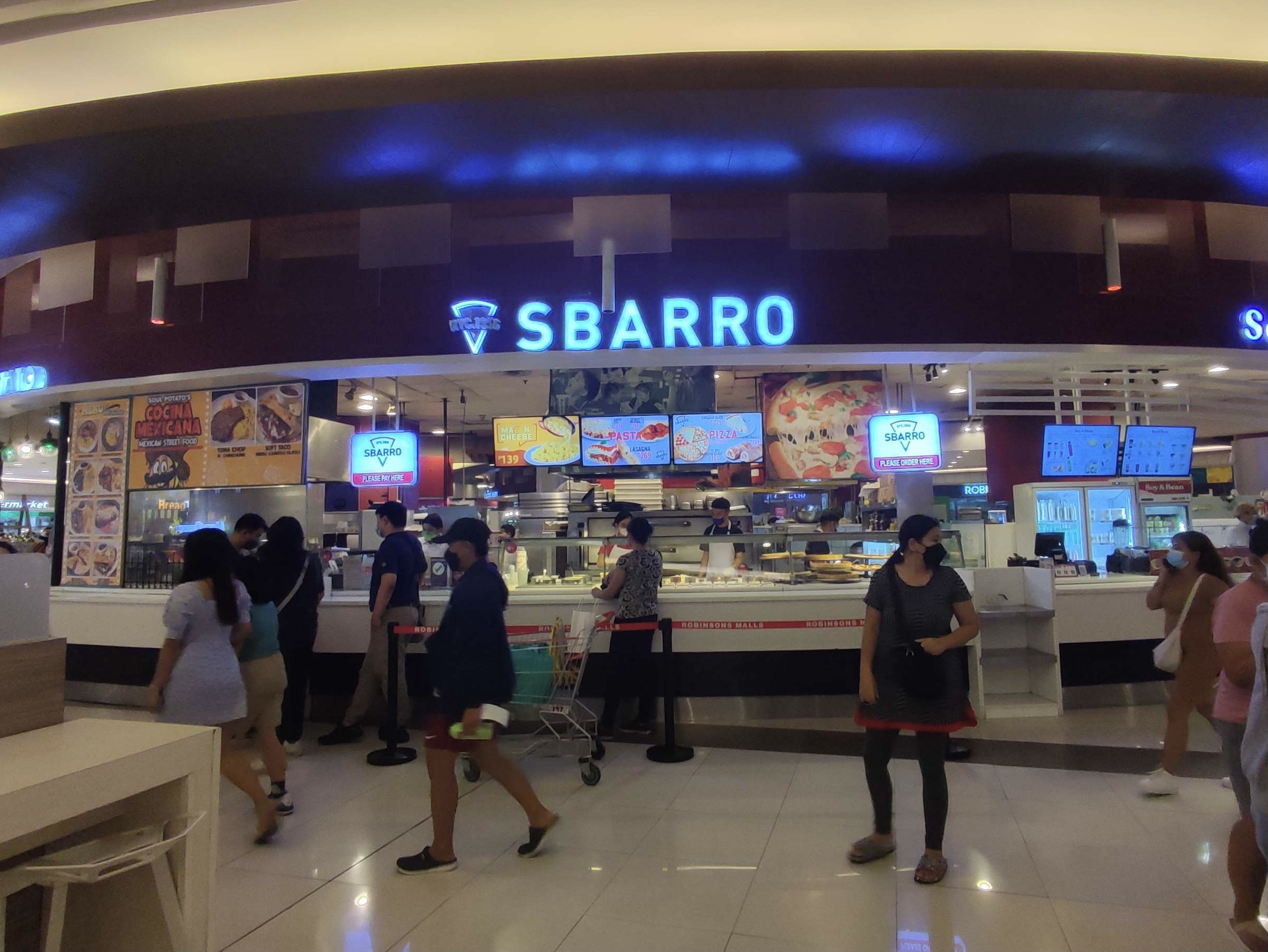
A Sbarro restaurant at a food court in Quezon City, Philippines

On March 15, 2012, Sbarro announced a franchise agreement with Upper Crust Foods Pvt. Ltd. to open restaurants in the Indian state of Maharashtra. The franchise was to develop and operate the restaurants. In July 2015, Sbarro announced that they planned to expand to 50 outlets in two years, from the 17 they had then.

In March 2013, Sbarro announced that J. David Karam would be the next CEO of the company. In March of the following year, the company again filed for Chapter 11 bankruptcy protection.

Sbarro announced on June 3, 2014, that they had exited from bankruptcy protection on June 2 based on a reorganization plan as approved by the court on May 19. One hundred and eighty-two locations were closed and the company announced plans to move its headquarters from New York City to Columbus, Ohio.

In January 2015, Sbarro's logo changed from a design resembling the Italian national flag, to an outline of a pizza slice in red and green, with the words "NYC.1956" to recollect the establishment's Brooklyn origins.

In 2016, Sbarro had 318 locations in the U.S., less than half of 12 years earlier. The decline of mall food courts and changing dietary choices among Americans are the major factors in Sbarro's regression.

==== Entering the UK market ====
On November 5, 2020, Sbarro announced it had agreed a partnership with the EG Group, a UK-based retail group, to enter the UK market, with the first store opening in EG’s Armada location in Birmingham, West Midlands. As of June 22, 2022, Sbarro has 15 stores in the UK, 7 of which are located within the North West of England. It plans to expand its locations throughout 2022. Sbarro also have partnerships with Asda, and the sites from EG Group transferred to EG On The Move.

=== Response to the 2022 Russian invasion of Ukraine ===
During the 2022 Russian invasion of Ukraine, Sbarro Pizza refused to join the international community's withdrawal from the Russian market. Research from Yale University that covered how companies were reacting to Russia's invasion identified Sbarro in the worst category of "Digging In", meaning "Defying Demands for Exit: companies defying demands for exit/reduction of activities". They received the lowest possible grade for continuing business as usual.

== Pizza Cucinova ==
In October 2013, Sbarro opened the first location of their fast-casual concept called Pizza Cucinova. The restaurants featured Neapolitan-style pizzas made to order with fresh, high-end ingredients and baked in woodstone ovens in under three minutes. Pizza Cucinova had multiple locations in Ohio and Texas before closing in 2020 due to the COVID-19 pandemic.

== See also ==
- List of pizza chains of the United States
- Sbarro restaurant suicide bombing
