= Rula Hassanein =

Palestinian journalist (born 1994)

- رولا حسنين
- Born: October 20, 1994 (age 31); Ramallah, Palestine
- Education: Birzeit University
- Occupations: Journalist; Activist

Rula Ibrahim Hassanein (Arabic: رولا حسنين; born 20 October 1994) is a Palestinian writer, activist, and journalist from Ramallah, who works with Al Jazeera. She has many writings and articles in many newspapers and news websites. She was arrested with 80 journalists from the West Bank and Jerusalem during the war on Gaza, on March 19, 2024, according to a joint statement by the Palestinian Ministry of Detainees and Ex-Detainees Affairs and The Palestinian Prisoners Society. An Israeli court denied her request for release, despite the fact that her nine-month-old Infant baby relies solely on her for breastfeeding.

== Education ==
Rula is a graduate of the Birzeit University with a major in Journalism and Media, and holds a Bachelor's degree in Media and Political Science, and a Master's degree in Contemporary Arab Studies from Birzeit University.

== Career and arrest ==
She has worked for a number of media outlets, including the Al Jazeera Arabic channel, the women's website "Banfasaj", the Palestinian women's radio station "Radio Nisa FM", and the "Jerusalem Center for Political Studies". And She previously worked for the "Watan News Agency" as a freelance journalist until her arrest by Israelis soldiers. She was arrested as a result of the harsh campaign waged by the Israeli occupation authorities against Palestinian journalists, as she was transparently covering the suffering of the Palestinian people with international and local media agencies. She is currently serving a period of detention in Hasharon Prison, and the lawyer of the Addameer Association submitted a request for her release due to her health condition and the conditions of her nine-month-old daughter, but the occupation refused.

"We call on Israeli authorities to release Rula Hassanein on humanitarian grounds so that she can look after her ailing nine-month-old daughter"

— Program Director Carlos Martinez de la Serna, in Committee to Protect Journalists,

From New York, on May 8, 2024, the Committee to Protect Journalists urged Israeli authorities to release Palestinian freelance journalist Rula Hassanein on humanitarian grounds due to the deteriorating health of her and her infant daughter since March, when she was arrested over comments she made on social media.

"The occupation must allow Rula to respond to the charges against her in a civilian court, not a military court, as a civilian court is the appropriate venue for addressing concerns about material published by a journalist on social media."

— Program Director Carlos Martinez de la Serna, in Committee to Protect Journalists,

She was released in a prisoner exchange on 20 January 2025.

== See also ==
- Palestinians in Israeli custody
- Administrative detention in Israel
- Israeli torture in the occupied territories
- Bushra al-Tawil
- Palestinian Prisoners' Document
- Mass detentions in the Gaza war
