= United Nations Alliance of Civilizations =

United Nations initiative

United Nations Alliance of Civilizations (UNAOC)
- United Nations Alliance of Civilizations
- Abbreviation: UNAOC
- Formation: 2005
- Type: United Nations entity (multilateral)
- Legal status: Active
- Headquarters: New York City
- Under-Secretary-General, High Representative: Miguel Ángel Moratinos
- Director: Nihal Saad
- Website: www.unaoc.org

The United Nations Alliance of Civilizations (UNAOC) is an initiative that attempts to "galvanize international action against extremism" through the forging of international, intercultural and interreligious dialogue and cooperation. The Alliance places a particular emphasis on defusing tensions between the Western and Islamic worlds.

The initiative was first proposed by the Prime Minister of Spain, José Luis Rodríguez Zapatero, at the 59th General Assembly of the United Nations (UN) in 2005. It was co-sponsored by the Turkish Prime Minister, Recep Tayyip Erdoğan.

On 14 July 2005, United Nations Secretary-General Kofi Annan formally proclaimed the launch of the Alliance of Civilizations at the United Nations Headquarters with the co-sponsorship of the governments of Spain and Turkey.

On 10 November 2009, the United Nations General Assembly recognized the mandate of the Alliance of Civilizations by adopting resolution A/RES/64/14 "The Alliance of Civilization", acknowledging the importance of intercultural and interreligious dialogue in promoting tolerance and expressing its continuous support for the work of the Alliance of Civilizations.

On 6 July 2015, Member States demonstrated their support for the work and achievements of the Alliance of Civilizations and adopted by consensus General Assembly resolution A/RES/69/312 "United Nations Alliance of Civilizations", hence affirming the status of the United Nations Alliance of Civilizations (UNAOC) as an initiative of the United Nations Secretary-General, an entity within the United Nations system.

In January 2026, the United States and Israel left the UNAOC.

== Structure and leadership ==
The "High Representative for the Alliance of Civilizations" is the title of the primary leadership position of UNAOC, who functions as a political facilitator and lead spokesperson, and consults directly with the United Nations Secretary-General. The High Representative holds the rank of Under-Secretary-General.

In April 2007, Secretary-General Ban Ki-moon assigned the position of High Representative to Jorge Sampaio, former President of Portugal.

In February 2013, Nassir Abdulaziz Al-Nasser, who served as President of the Sixty-sixth Session of the United Nations General Assembly (2011-2012), assumed the post of High Representative, succeeding President Sampaio in the position.

In January 2019, Secretary-General António Guterres appointed Miguel Ángel Moratinos, former Minister of Foreign Affairs of Spain, as High Representative.

In 2023, Nihal Saad, former TV journalist from Egypt, assumed the role of Director of UNAOC. Before assuming the post of Director, Ms. Saad served as the Chief of Cabinet and Spokesperson for the High Representative from 2013 to 2023.

The Secretariat of the Alliance of Civilizations provides support to the High Representative and implements developmental functions of UNAOC.

== Location ==
The United Nations Alliance of Civilizations is headquartered at the United Nations campus in New York. In 2021, a second UNAOC office was inaugurated at the Palais des Nations in Geneva.

== Inception ==
The group argues that mutual suspicion, fear and misunderstanding between Islamic and Christian Western societies has been increasing for the past millennium. Due to diverging backgrounds, instability of coexistence between these groups is argued to have led to exploitation by extremists, with the severest form being ultimate acts of violence. Belen Alfaro, then Ambassador-at-large for the Alliance of Civilizations, believes that efforts should be made to reach a common ground between diverse ethnic and religious groups, balancing their fundamental set of values and beliefs. She believes that, in this way, an attempt can be made to quell extremism and a coalition can be established to work toward peaceful coexistence between diverse groups, thereby supporting international stability.

The Alliance of Civilizations initiative was proposed by the Spanish Prime Minister, José Luis Rodríguez Zapatero, at the 59th General Assembly of the United Nations in 2005. It was co-sponsored by the Turkish Prime Minister, Recep Tayyip Erdoğan. The aim of the initiative was to produce actionable, time-bound recommendations by the end of 2006 for UN member states to adopt.

To fulfill the objective of the initiative, UN Secretary-General Kofi Annan assembled a High-Level Group (HLG) consisting of 20 eminent persons drawn from policy making, academia, civil society, religious leadership, and the media. A full range of religions and civilizations were represented. Among the members were former Iranian President Mohammad Khatami, who proposed the Dialogue Among Civilizations initiative, Archbishop Desmond Tutu, South African Nobel laureate, Prof. Pan Guang, who obtained the Saint Petersburg-300 Medal for Contribution to China-Russia Relations, and Arthur Schneier, who is the founder and president of the “Appeal of Conscience Foundation” and who gained the "Presidential Citizens Medal”. The HLG met five times between November 2005 and November 2006, and produced a report prioritising relations between the Western and Muslim societies.

The first meeting of the HLG of the AoC occurred in Spain in November 2005. The second meeting was in Doha, Qatar, from 25 to 27 February 2006 with the agenda of aiming to find ways to calm the cartoon crisis between West and Islamic world. The third meeting took place in Dakar, Senegal, from 28 to 30 May 2006. At the final meeting in November 2006 in Istanbul, the members presented their final report to Kofi Annan and to Prime Ministers José Luis Rodríguez Zapatero and Recep Tayyip Erdoğan. The report outlined recommendations and practical solutions on how the Western and Islamic societies can solve misconceptions and misunderstandings between them. According to the report, "politics, not religion, is at the heart of growing Muslim-Western divide", although a large emphasis is maintained on religion.

The High-Level Group’s report, published on 13 November 2006, put forth recommendations that became the guiding principles for the implementation of the Alliance. In particular, it identified four priority areas of action for the Alliance of Civilizations, which all play a critical role in reducing cross-cultural tensions and building bridges between communities, and to which the Alliance of Civilizations should bring a multidisciplinary and multi-perspective approach: Youth, Education, Media, and Migration.

In May 2007, UNAOC released its "Implementation Plan 2007–2009", which elaborated on the notion that the AoC will not replace or reconstitute any existing plans or political channels. Rather, the AoC will facilitate its goals primarily through partnership operations among a variety of existing groups, and also through projects in youth, education, media, and migration. The core of the 16-page document consists of two parts. The first part, drawing directly on the 2006 HLG report, describes the strategic and structural framework for the AoC. Included are plans for an AoC forum held in varying locations annually, the "Group of Friends" representatives from States and international organizations, and UN Secretary-General-appointed ambassadors to the AoC. Financing will be accomplished via the AoC Voluntary Trust Fund with support from various organizations. The second part of the plan calls for actions to staff the office of the Secretariat by Summer 2007, and to implement the directives established in the first part of the document. A mid-term review of the plan of action is intended in 2008. The first group of ambassadors will be listed by the end of 2007, and the first annual AoC forum will be held 15–16 January in 2008 in Spain, with a focus on youth. The AoC will establish a rapid-response media-based mechanism to intervene in escalations of global tension. The plans were discussed with UN Secretary-General Ban Ki-moon on 14 June 2007.

On 24 June, Ban Ki-moon spoke at a commemoration of 13th century Muslim poet Rumi in New York, in which he embraced the teachings of the poet, expressing the resonance with the goals of the AoC.

== Priority areas ==
=== UNAOC projects and initiatives ===
- UNAOC Youth Solidarity Fund
- UNAOC Fellowship Programme
- UNAOC Young Peacebuilders
- Intercultural Innovation Hub (IIH), formerly Intercultural Innovation Award (IIA) (in partnership with BMW Group and with the support of Accenture)
- PLURAL+ Youth Video Festival (in partnership with IOM)
- Sport for One Humanity initiative (in partnership with Turkish Airlines)
- News Generation Against Hate (in partnership with La Courneuve)
- Promoting the Role of Women as Peacemakers
- EDIN: Empowering Dialogue and Interfaith Networks (in partnership with UNOCT)
- Intercultural Leaders and Alumni Engagement (in partnership with BMW Group)
- Youth Waging Peace
- Digital Games for Peace
- #SpreadNoHate Initiative
- PEACEapp
- Media and Information Literacy

== UNAOC Global Forums ==
In its 2006 report, the UNAOC High-Level Group recommended that UNAOC organize a recurring Global Forum under United Nations auspices to provide a regular venue for representatives of governments, international organizations, civil society, and the private sector to forge partnerships and to express commitments for action.

UNAOC convened its first Global Forum in Madrid, Spain, in 2008. Since then, it has organized nine Global Forums, including in Istanbul, Turkey (2009); Rio de Janeiro, Brazil (2010); Doha, Qatar (2011); Vienna, Austria (2013); Bali, Indonesia (2014); Baku, Azerbaijan (2016); United Nations Headquarters in New York (2018); and Fez, Morocco (2022).

=== 10th Global Forum: Cascais, Portugal (2025) ===
The United Nations Alliance of Civilizations (UNAOC) convened its 10th Global Forum in Cascais, Portugal, from 25-27 November 2025 under the theme “United in Peace: Restoring Trust, Reshaping the Future — Reflecting on Two Decades of Dialogue for Humanity”.

=== 9th Global Forum: Fez, Morocco (2022) ===
The United Nations Alliance of Civilizations (UNAOC) convened its 9th Global Forum, which was hosted in Fez by the Kingdom of Morocco, from 22-23 November 2022 under the theme “Towards an Alliance of Peace: Living Together as One Humanity”. The international event brought together over 2,000 participants from 136 countries, including high-level officials, political leaders, multilateral organizations, civil society representatives, religious leaders, faith-based organizations, youth leaders, media entities, and a wide range of other stakeholders.

=== 8th Global Forum: United Nations Headquarters New York (2018) ===
In 2018, UNAOC convened its 8th Global Forum in the United Nations Headquarters in New York City, USA, under the theme "#Commit2Dialogue: Partnerships for Prevention and Sustaining Peace".

=== 7th Global Forum: Baku, Azerbaijan (2016) ===
In 2016, Azerbaijan hosted the 7th UNAOC Global Forum in Baku from 25-27 April under the theme "Living Together In Inclusive Societies: A Challenge and A Goal". The gathering emphasized the role and impact of government and religious leaders, civil society, businesses as well as of the UNAOC programmatic focus areas of Education, Youth, Media and Migration in promoting inclusivity and preventing violent extremism. Among the major outcomes of the Forum was the adoption by consensus of the Baku Declaration by the UNAOC Group of Friends, which will guide future efforts towards achieving UNAOC goals and reaffirms the integral role of UNAOC as a global platform for facilitating collaboration.

=== 6th Global Forum: Bali, Indonesia (2014) ===
The 6th Global Forum of the United Nations Alliance of Civilizations was held in Bali, Indonesia from 29-30 August 2014, with the theme "Unity in Diversity: Celebrating diversity for common and shared values."

=== 5th Global Forum: Vienna, Austria (2013) ===
The fifth Global Forum of UNAOC was held in Vienna, Austria in 2013.

=== 4th Global Forum: Doha, Qatar (2011) ===
The United Nations Alliance of Civilizations convened its 4th Global Forum in Doha, Qatar from December 11-13, 2011. Over 2,000 participants, including political and corporate leaders, civil society activists, youth groups, faith communities, research centers, foundations and journalists, came together to agree on joint actions to improve relations across cultures, combat prejudice and build lasting peace.

=== 3rd Forum: Rio de Janeiro, Brazil (2010) ===
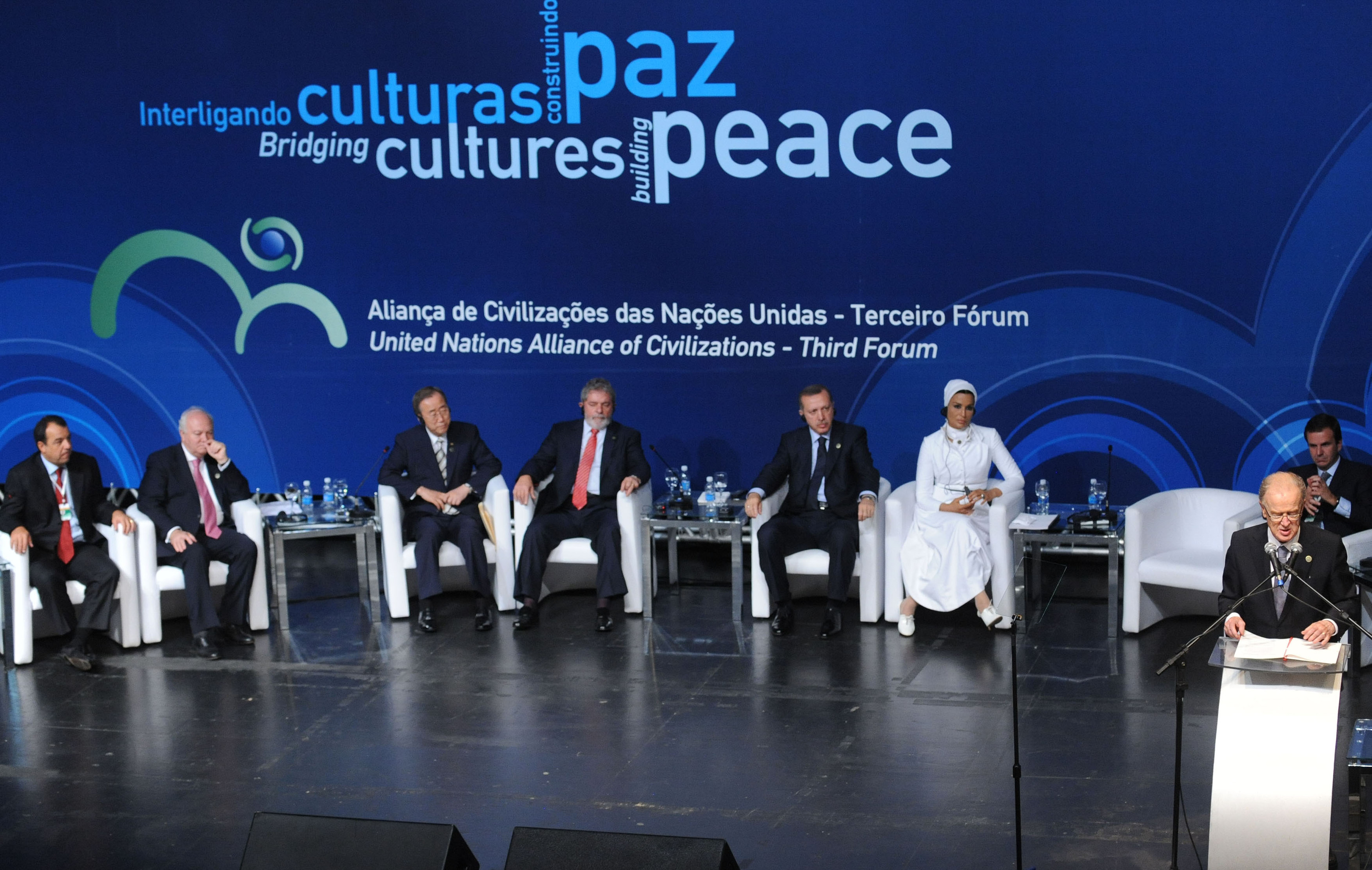
Leaders speaking at the 2010 Forum

On 27–29 May 2010, a network of over 2,000 political and corporate leaders, civil society activists, youth, journalists, foundations, and religious leaders gathered in Rio de Janeiro, under the theme "Bridging Cultures, Building Peace," for the third United Nations Alliance of Civilizations' forum.

The theme of the conference set out key questions for the participants to discuss over the course of the three-day forum, these included:

- What kind of actions do we need to combat intolerance and prejudice?
- What tools do children and young people need to navigate an increasingly complex and multicultural world?
- What is the impact of globalization on people’s sense of belonging and identity?
- How do economic inequalities impact on relations among diverse communities?
- How can the media help bridge cross-‐cultural divides and change perceptions of the other?
- How can we create inclusive societies, founded on the respect for human rights and diversity?

Towards the conclusion of the Third Forum of the Alliance, the outcomes were announced by Jorge Sampaio, the High Representative of the UN Alliance of Civilizations and former President of Portugal. The results presented the commitments of all participants to the existing initiatives, as well as new ones, such as the inauguration of the first two Dialogue Cafés, which uses video conferencing technology to connect young people in different parts of the world; the first conference of the Global Youth Movement; the creation of the United Nations University International Institute for the Alliance of Civilizations; and launching of the Online Community on Migration and Integration in partnership with the International Organization for Migration.

=== 2nd Forum: Istanbul, Turkey (2009) ===
The second Forum of the Alliance of Civilizations was held in Istanbul, Turkey, on 6–7 April 2009.

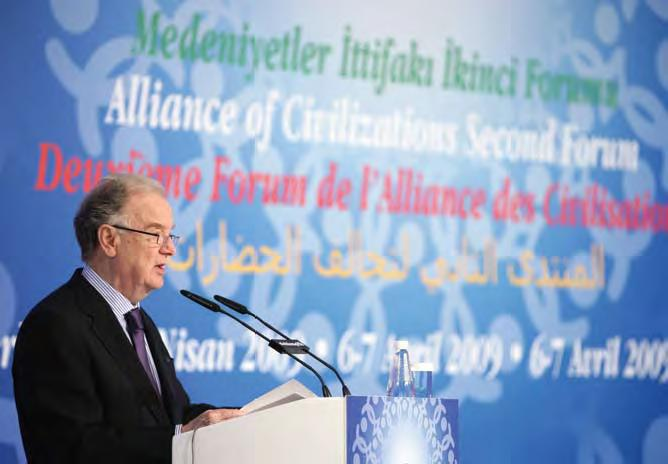
Jorge Sampaio, the UN High Representative for the Alliance of Civilizations, speaking at the 2009 Istanbul Forum

From 6–7 April 2009, nearly 2,000 participants—among them several Heads of Government. over 50 ministers, as well as policymakers, foundations, media and grassroots leaders from around the world—convened at the Çırağan Palace Hotel in Istanbul, Turkey, to forge new partnerships, generated ideas aimed at building trust and cooperation among diverse communities and advance the Civilizations' goals. The Forum also served as an opportunity to take stock of initiatives developed by the Alliance, to showcase practical projects in collaboration with civil society and corporate partners and to launch new programs.

The results of the forum emphasized the commitment of the Alliance to the existing initiatives, as well as new ones, such as the Education about Religions and Beliefs; Alliance Fellowship Program; Dialogue Cafe; PLURAL +; Restore Trust, Rebuild Bridges; Mapping Media Education Policies in the World: Visions, Programs and Challenges; and the Alliance of Civilizations Research Network. The Alliance also was able to establish partnership agreements with seven international networks, such as the International Organization for Migration, the Organisation of the Islamic Conference, the Ibero-American General Secretariat, the Anna Lindh Foundation, Organisation internationale de la Francophonie, the Community of Portuguese Language Countries and the Union Latine.

The President of the United States, Barack Obama, who was visiting Istanbul that day, was originally expected to attend the second day of the meeting, but paid a surprise visit to the U.S. troops in Iraq instead.

=== 1st Forum: Madrid, Spain (2008) ===
The first forum of the Alliance of Civilizations was held in Madrid, Spain, on 15–16 January 2008. It was attended by over 900 participants in 89 official delegations from 78 countries.

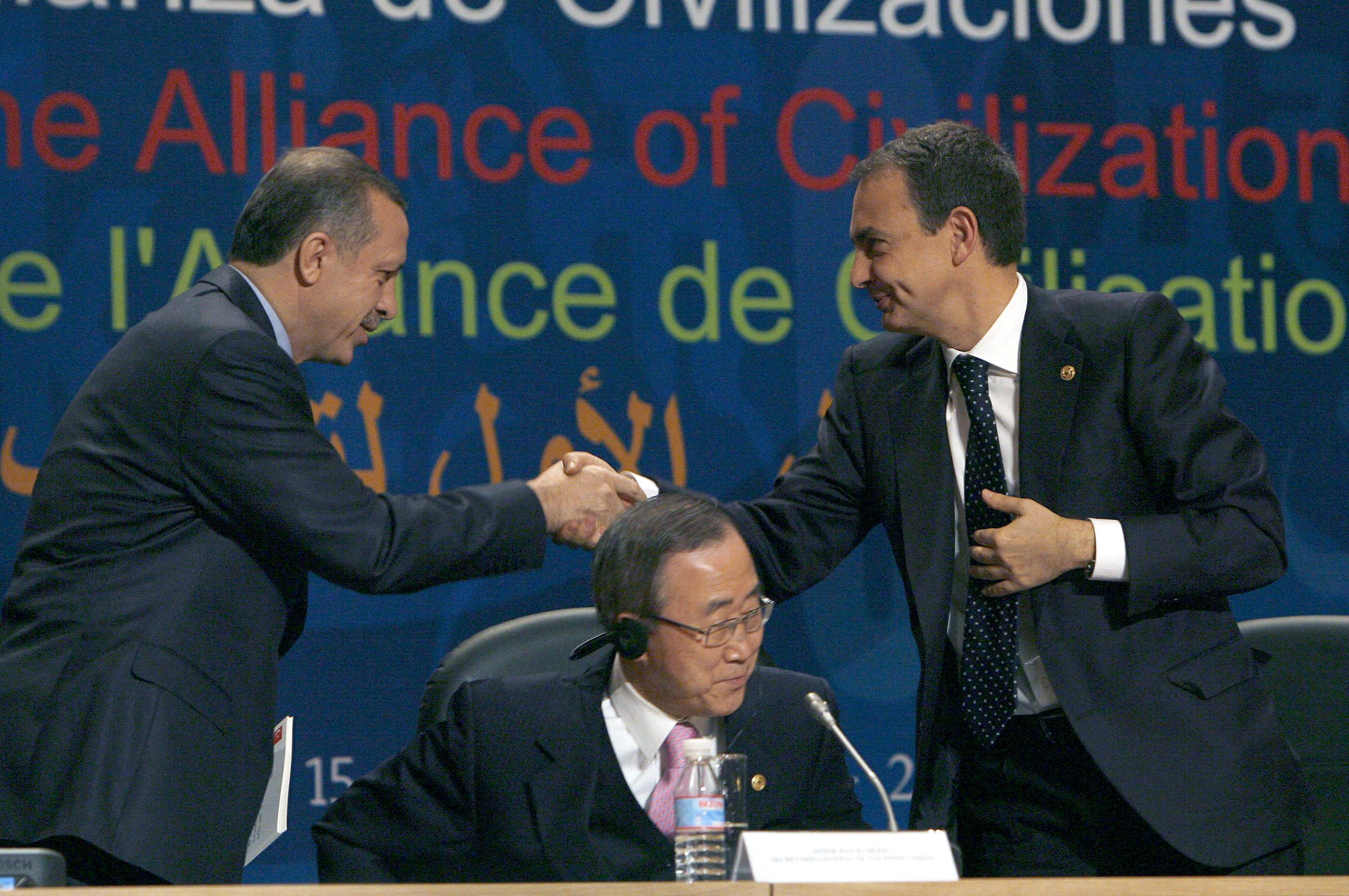
Turkish Prime Minister Recep Tayyip Erdoğan (left), Secretary-General of the United Nations Ban Ki-moon (centre), and Spanish Prime Minister José Luis Rodríguez Zapatero (right)

The forum was hosted by the monarchy of Spain, and it convened leaders, activists, scholars, and public figures from every region of the world in an effort to find new ways to bridge the growing divide between nations and cultures, and to establish new partnerships to promote global understanding.

Over one and a half days, political leaders including heads of State and Government; Ministers and senior officials; civil society activists and Nobel laureates; corporate executives; religious leaders; and leading scholars dialogued and debated with each other, launched practical initiatives and made commitments to action aimed at improving relations across regions and cultures.

Among the results were the announcement of a number of initiatives concerning media, educational and other programmes to advance AoC objectives in various countries, and the signing of Memoranda of Understanding with UNESCO, the League of Arab States, ISESCO, the Arab League Educational, Cultural and Scientific Organization (ALECSO), and United Cities and Local Governments (UCLG), and a Letter of Intent with the Council of Europe.

== Recognition ==
In 2007 the Alliance was presented with the "Dialogue of Civilizations" award, which was given by the Rumi Forum and the Georgetown University Center for Peace and Security Research in Washington. Spanish Prime Minister José Luis Rodriguez Zapatero and Turkish Prime Minister Recep Tayyip Erdoğan received the award.

== Criticism ==
UNAOC was criticised for its partiality of Abrahamic religions — Islam, Christianity and Judaism — over others. In a UN General Assembly discussion on resolutions of the UN Alliance of Civilizations on the Culture of Peace, India asked the United Nations to recognise violence against religious minorities such as Hinduism, Buddhism, Jainism, and Sikhism.
