= 2015 Shvut Rachel shooting =

Hamas shooting attack against Israeli civilians

- Location: Allon Road, West Bank
- Date: 29 June 2015
- Attack type: Mass shooting
- Deaths: 1 civilian
- Injuries: 3 civilians
- Assailants: Abdallah As’hak, Faiz Ahmed (indicted)

On 29 June 2015, Hamas gunmen opened fire on a civilian vehicle moving along Israeli Route 60 near Shvut Rachel in the West Bank. Four Israeli civilians in the car were wounded and rushed to hospital, where one died. The suspects were later arrested.

== Shooting ==
The shooting took place after dark on Monday, 29 June 2015, on the Allon Road, south of Duma. The victims were recreational basketball players, driving home after a game and attempted to escape, but the automatic weapons had disabled the car they were driving.

According to Israeli security services, the same Hamas militant cell that carried out this attack, had fired, two days prior, at several vehicles including an ambulance on a road near Beitin, without causing casualties. News accounts frequently pair this attack with the shooting of Danny Gonen.

== Casualties ==
Malachi Rosenfeld (Malakhi Rosenfeld, Malachy Rosenfeld) died of his wounds at the Shaare Zedek Medical Center. Rosenfeld was a student, enrolled in the joint philosophy and economics program at the Hebrew University. Yair Hooper, sustained injuries to his torso and lower body. The two others in the car were also injured. All four were taken to Hadassah Hospital, Ein Kerem for treatment.

All four victims lived in Kokhav HaShahar. Rosenfeld was buried in Kohav HaSharar on 1 July 2015.

== Suspects ==
The Palestinian militant groups Fatah al-Intifada, the Popular Front for the Liberation of Palestine and the Izz ad-Din al-Qassam Brigades (the military wing of Hamas) each claimed to have carried out the shooting.

Seven Palestinians were arrested on suspicion of being members of the Hamas militant network involved in the attack. Six of the seven were from Silwad, and the seventh was from Qusra. Some of the arrests were made by the security forces of the Palestinian Authority. Among those arrested were Amjad Najar, Maad Hamad (who authorities suspected of being the shooter), Abdallah Atzhak (a former prisoner and suspected driver of the get-away car), Faaz Hamad (a known Hamas operative, who confessed), and Jamal Younes (who confessed to having the car used by the cell to a wrecking yard and to and helping the group acquire weapons). This so-called "Silwad cell" is known to have carried out three shooting attacks in the Binyamin region.

Security officials stated that Ahmed Najar wired funds to the group through his brother Amjad Najar, who lived in Silwad. Black market prices for weapons and ammunition in the Palestinian Authority-controlled areas have been rising, necessitating outside funding for the operation. A Kalashnikov rifle sold at the time for $6,400 (24,000 shekels) and bullets sold for 12 shekels each.

=== Hamas militant cell operated from Jordan ===
Among the suspected perpetrators were Ahmed Najar (b. 1976) (Ahmed Mustafa Saleh Hamed al-Najar), a Hamas militant accused of funding and masterminding the shooting. Najar (b. 1976), of Silwad, a resident of Jordan, was previously convicted of murdering six Israelis. He served multiple terms in Israeli prisons, most recently from December 2003 to October 2011, before being released in the 2011 Gilad Shalit prisoner exchange. Najar was released into Hamas-ruled Gaza, but he had moved from Gaza to Jordan, and is alleged to have planned and supported the attack from Jordan. The cell was one among "no fewer than (150) cells in the West Bank," remotely operated from either Gaza or Turkey.

The fact that this raid was directed by a Hamas operative in Jordan raised concerns within the Israeli security establishment that Jordan might have softened its opposition to allowing Hamas to operate in Jordanian territory.

=== Hamas militant network operated from Turkey ===
Hamas operative Saleh al-Arouri, a Palestinian resident of Turkey, is accused of being the overall mastermind of this attack. He "coordinated" the terror slaying of Malachi Rosenberg.

== Legal proceedings ==
Abdallah As’hak and Faiz Ahmed were indicted for the murder.

In September, Palestinian Authority officials were known to be holding two suspects charges with Rosenfeld's murder, this is part of a broad Palestinian Authority crackdown on Hamas activity in Palestinian Authority controlled territory.

Palestinian Arab Amjad Hamad was convicted and sentenced to life in prison for being the leader of the four-man Hamas terrorist cell that carried out the shooting. In January 2025, the release of Hamad was agreed upon as part of a three-phase Gaza war ceasefire, aimed at securing the release of Israeli hostages held in Gaza.

== Impact ==
In November 2015, the house of one of the killers, Maad Hamed of Kfar Silwad, was demolished under an Israeli court order.

Following this attack, Defense Minister Moshe Ya’alon restricted Muslim access to the Temple Mount arguing that Palestinian leaders were exploiting the holy month of Ramadan to incite terror attacks.

Following the event MK Nissan Slomiansky requested that the government respond to the attack by granting regional TABA (land designation)s to allow the construction of new housing units in Shvut Rachel. MK Yoel Hasson argued against granting the new building permits.

There was speculation that the Duma village arson attack might have been undertaken in revenge for the murder of Malachi Rosenberg.

The incident has raised concern in Israel about the extent to which the policies of the Abbas government actually incite terrorism and violence.

An illegal settlement named "Malachei Shalom" (Hebrew for Angels of Peace) in memory of the murdered man, Malachi Rosenfeld, was created, but rapidly evacuated by Israeli security forces.

=== Prisoner exchanges ===
The shooting has figured largely in the ongoing Israeli political debate over the release of convicted militants. Rosenfeld was the sixth Israeli to be killed in 2014 and 2015 by convicted militants released in the Gilad Shalit prisoner exchange. Hamas militant attacks in the Palestinian Authority controlled areas of the West Bank are said to be operated by former prisoners now living in Gaza.
