= Nihal Saad =

Egyptian journalist and UN official

- نهال سعد

Director of the United Nations Alliance of Civilizations (UNAOC)

Director of UNAOC
- Secretary-General: António Guterres
- High Representative: Miguel Ángel Moratinos

Personal details
- Born: Egypt
- Education: Masters in TV Journalism, American University in Cairo

Nihal Saad (Arabic: نهال سعد, [nɪˈhæːl sæʕd]) is the Director of the United Nations Alliance of Civilizations (UNAOC). She previously served as the Chief of Cabinet and Spokesperson for the High Representative.

As UNAOC Director, she leads the organization's policy and strategy; and reports to Miguel Ángel Moratinos, Under-Secretary-General and High Representative.

== Director of UNAOC ==
She heads the United Nations Alliance of Civilizations (UNAOC) Secretariat and acts as Vice Chair of the Working Group of Preventing and Countering Violent Extremism (PCVE) of the Counter-Terrorism Office. She is the co-chair of the United Nations Interagency Task Force for Religion and Development (UNIATF).

Ms. Saad also advises the UN Secretary General's Office on issues relevant to inter-religious and intercultural dialogue and other issues relevant to the mandate of UNAOC.

== United Nations Career ==
Before joining UNAOC, from 2011 to 2012, Nihal Saad was the Spokesperson and Head of Communications for the President of the United Nations General Assembly, Mr. Nassir Abdulaziz Al-Nasser of Qatar, who later assumed the role of High Representative for UNAOC in 2013.

== Journalism career ==
Nihal Saad interviewing the future King Charles III in 2006 for Egypt's Nile TV.

Before joining the United Nations, Ms. Saad was a journalist in Egypt. She was one of the English TV anchors of Nile TV International, based in Cairo. She also served as the Head of the Press and Information Bureau at the Permanent Mission of Egypt to the United Nations.

From 2009 to 2011, she was Senior Political Correspondent and TV host for Egypt's TV specializing in International affairs with a special focus on Egypt-US relations and the Middle East and North Africa region.

== Speaking Engagements ==
Nihal Saad is an international moderator who has moderated panel discussions in international and regional meetings. Ms. Saad has appeared on several TV shows as a political commentator on foreign affairs, including Larry King (CNN), Al Arabiya TV, France 24, Egypt's Nile TV International, the New York times, AP and other international media outlets.

Nihal Saad moderating a plenary session at the 8th UNAOC Global Forum in New York

== Education ==
She holds a master's degree in TV journalism from the American University in Cairo.
