= David Meidan =

Israeli negotiator (born 1955)

- דוד מידן
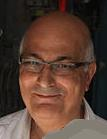
- Born: 1955 (age 70–71), Egypt
- Occupations: Former Mossad official; Negotiator for POWs and MIAs
- Military career
- Allegiance: Israel
- Branch: Mossad

Coordinator for POWs and MIAs
- Incumbent
- Assumed office November 2011
- Prime Minister: Benjamin Netanyahu
- Preceded by: Hagai Hadas

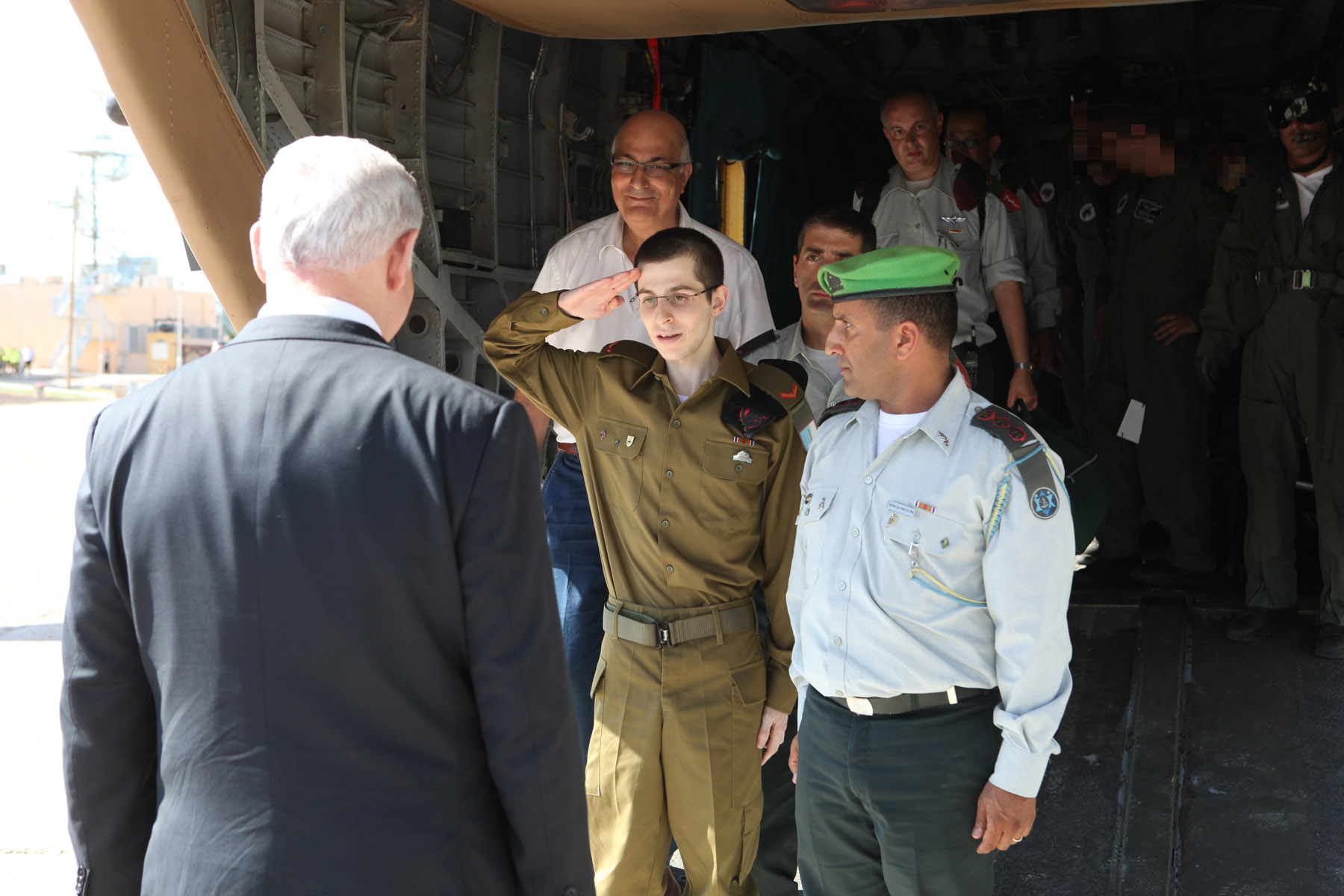
Gilad Shalit returning home, with David Meidan standing behind.

David Meidan (Hebrew: דוד מידן; born 1955) is a former Mossad official, serving as Israeli Prime Minister Benjamin Netanyahu's coordinator on the issue of POWs and MIAs. Served as personal representative of Prime Minister Netanyahu in the Gilad Shalit prisoner exchange - negotiations for the release of kidnapped IDF soldier Gilad Shalit, and was perceived as bringing closure to the deal. Recently, Meidan was also appointed as special envoy to Turkey in an effort to bring back warm relations between Israel and Turkey.

== Biography ==
Born in Egypt to Nathan and Rose Mosseri. In 1957, he made Aliyah with his family to Israel. Served in the army in Unit 8200. In the Mossad, he served in part as a Collecting officer in the "Tzomet" division, responsible for recruiting and activating agents and was responsible for several branches of the Mossad abroad. In 2006 he became head of the Mossad's "Tevel" division, the branch responsible for External Relations with peer organizations around the world. In his capacity he was involved in activities related to Gilad Shalit, who was captured by Hamas in June 2006.

In April 2011, Meidan was appointed by Prime Minister Benjamin Netanyahu as successor to Hagai Hadas as his representative in the negotiations to release Gilad Shalit, and was a key member of the Israeli delegation who worked with government officials in Egypt outlining the deal for Shalit's release. As part of his role he met with the various parties, and was in touch with the Shalit family. After six months of activity in this position, an agreement between Israel and Hamas was reached, signed on 6 October 2011, in which Shalit was released in return for the release of 1,027 Palestinians terrorists imprisoned in Israel. After the swap-deal was approved by the Government of Israel, Meidan went to Egypt to coordinate the technical arrangements of the swap. He was the first Israeli representative to receive Gilad Shalit at Kerem Shalom border crossing.

In November 2011, he was appointed coordinator on behalf of Prime Minister Benjamin Netanyahu on the issue of POWs and MIAs.

Meidan is married to Daphne, and a father of two daughters.
