= 1989 Purim stabbing attack =

Palestinian attack against civilians in Tel Aviv, Israel

- Native name: פיגוע הדקירה בחגיגות פורים בתל אביב
- Location: Tel Aviv, Israel
- Date: 21 March 1989; 37 years ago
- Attack type: Stabbing attack
- Weapon: Knife
- Deaths: 2 Israeli civilians
- Injuries: 1 Israeli civilian
- Assailant: Muhammad Zakut
- No. of participants: 1

The 1989 Purim stabbing attack was the random stabbing of Israeli civilians in Tel Aviv, Israel on the Jewish holiday of Purim on 21 March 1989. The attacker was an Arab construction worker. Two civilians were murdered and one severely injured in the attack.

== Attack ==
Muhammad Zakut stabbed three Israeli with a commando knife as he shouted "Allahu Akbar" (God is great). One of the victims, Kurt Moshe Schallinger, 73, was killed as he left his car on a Tel Aviv street full of children in costume, celebrating the holiday of Purim. During his interrogation, Zakut said his goal was to "stab in the neck the first Israeli his eyes fell on." He murdered two Israelis and severely injured a third in the back of his head and his spinal cord before being caught. One of the victims was an elderly scientist on his way home from delivering mishloah manot. The other was the head of the Environment Association in Tel Aviv.

== Assailant ==
Prior to the attack, the assailant, Muhammad Zakut, was a construction worker and later in a laundromat in Tel Aviv.

Zakut received a life sentence, but on 18 October 2011 he was released to Gaza as part of the Gilad Shalit prisoner exchange between Israel and Hamas.

== See also ==
- Palestinian political violence
- Stabbing as a terrorist tactic
