= Sheffield Club bombing =

Palestinian suicide attack in Israel, 7 May 2002

Coordinates: 31.9918°N 34.7696°E

- Part of the Second Intifada militancy campaign
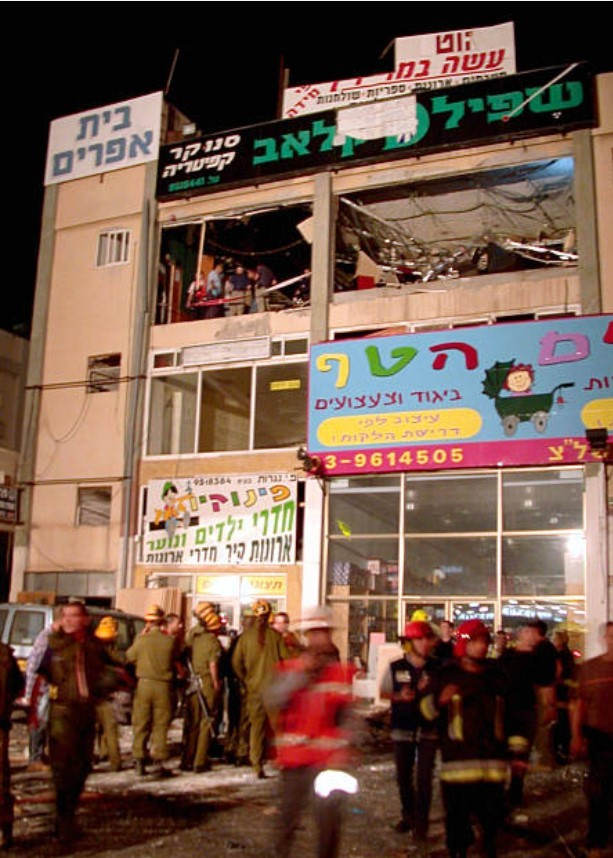
- The attack aftermath

- The attack site
- Native name: הפיגוע במועדון השפילד קלאב
- Location: Rishon Lezion, Israel
- Date: 7 May 2002; 24 years ago 11:03 pm
- Target: Attendees at the Sheffield Club
- Attack type: Suicide bombing
- Deaths: 15 (+1 bomber)
- Injuries: 55
- Perpetrator: Hamas claimed responsibility

On 7 May 2002, a suicide bombing occurred at the Sheffield Club, a crowded game club located in the new industrial area of Rishon LeZion, Israel. 16 people were killed in the attack and 55 were injured. The Islamic militant group Hamas claimed responsibility for the attack.

== The attack ==
On Tuesday, 7 May 2002, at 11:03 pm, a Palestinian suicide bomber detonated a hidden explosive device within the crowded Sheffield Club, located in the new industrial area of Rishon Lezion, only 10 km south of Tel Aviv, killing 15 civilians and injuring 55 people, 10 critically.

After the attack the Israeli police stated that the suicide bomber was carrying a briefcase full of explosives and in addition was also wearing an explosive belt. The police estimated that the total weight of explosives were between 7 and 8 kilograms, and stated that the briefcase contained also metal fragments and bolts in order to maximize the number of casualties in the attack.

Photos from the attack site

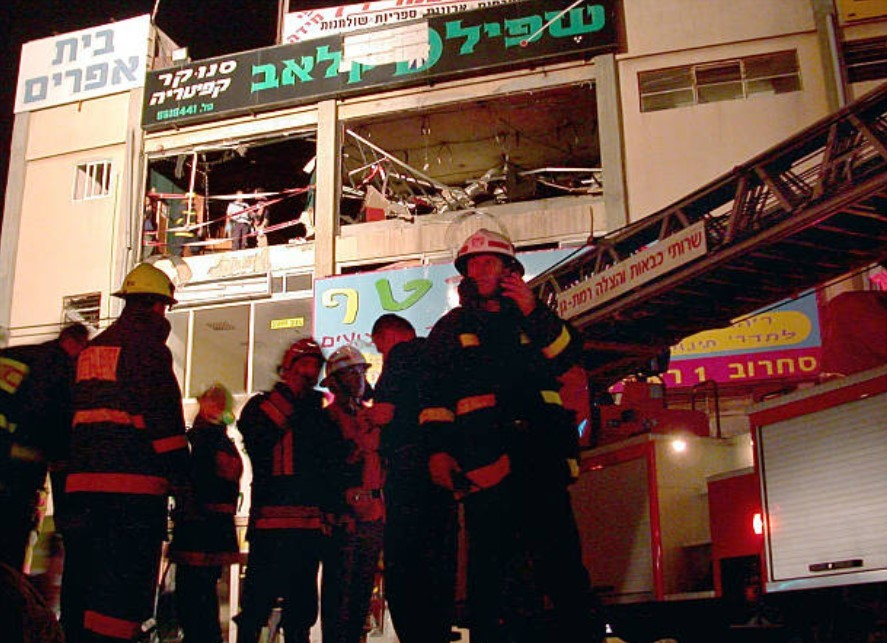

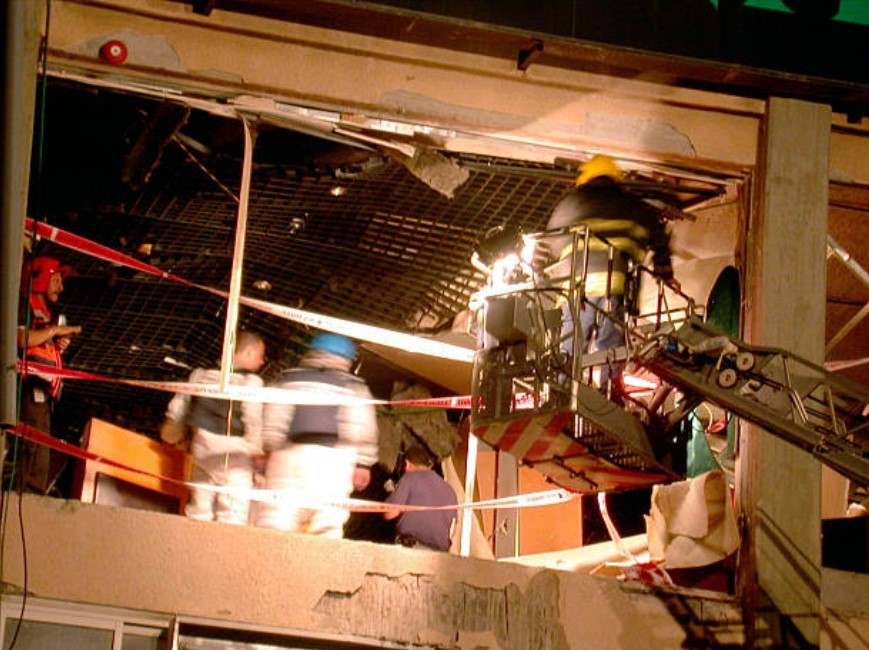

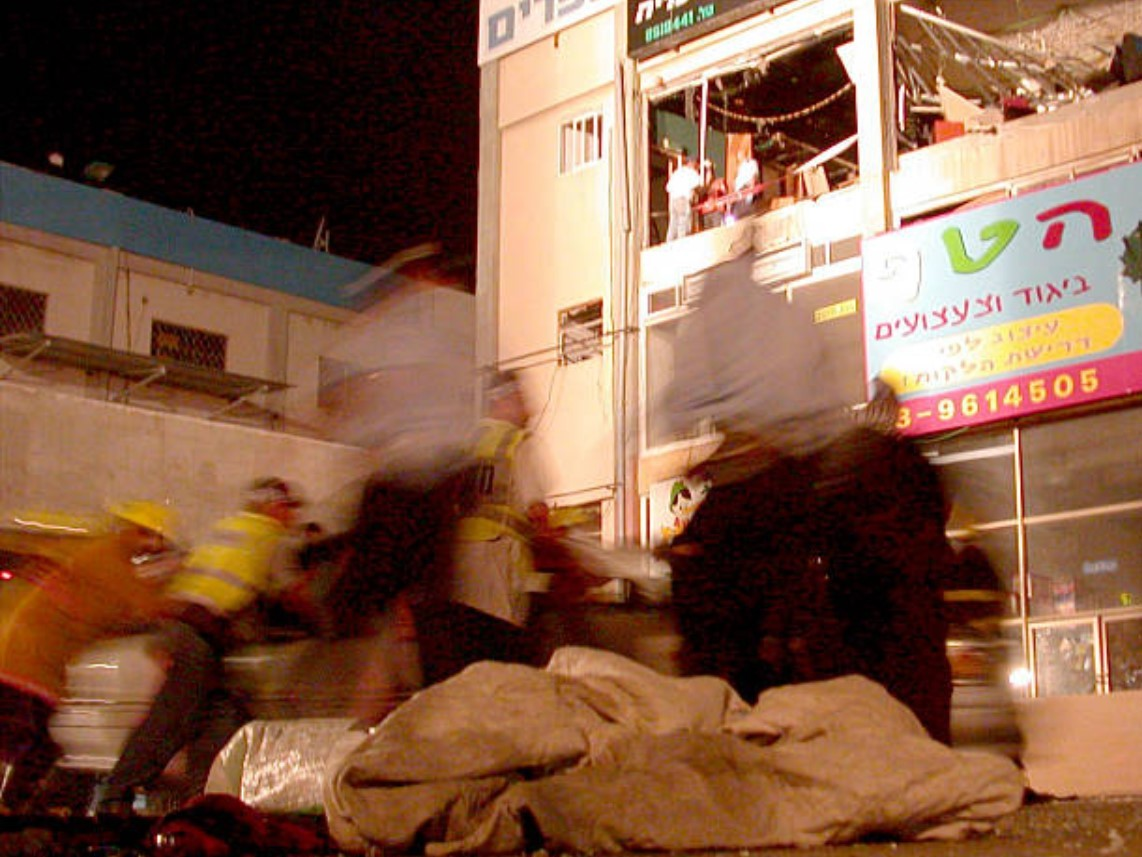

== The victims ==
The fifteen people who were killed were:

- Esther Bablar, 54, of Bat Yam;
- Yitzhak Bablar, 57, of Bat Yam;
- Avi Bayaz, 26, of Nes Ziona;
- Regina Malka Boslan, 62, of Jaffa;
- Edna Cohen, 61, of Holon;
- Rafael Haim, 64, of Tel-Aviv;
- Pnina Hikri, 60, of Tel-Aviv;
- Nawa Hinawi, 51, of Tel-Aviv;
- Rahamim Kimchy, 58, of Rishon Lezion;
- Nir Lovatin, 31, of Rishon Lezion;
- Shoshana Magmari, 51, of Tel-Aviv;
- Dalia Masa, 56, of Nahalat Yehuda;
- Rassan Sharouk, 60, of Holon;
- Israel Shikar, 49, of Rishon Lezion;
- Anat Teremforush, 36, of Ashdod

== The perpetrator ==
The Islamic militant group Hamas claimed responsibility for the attack.

== Aftermath ==
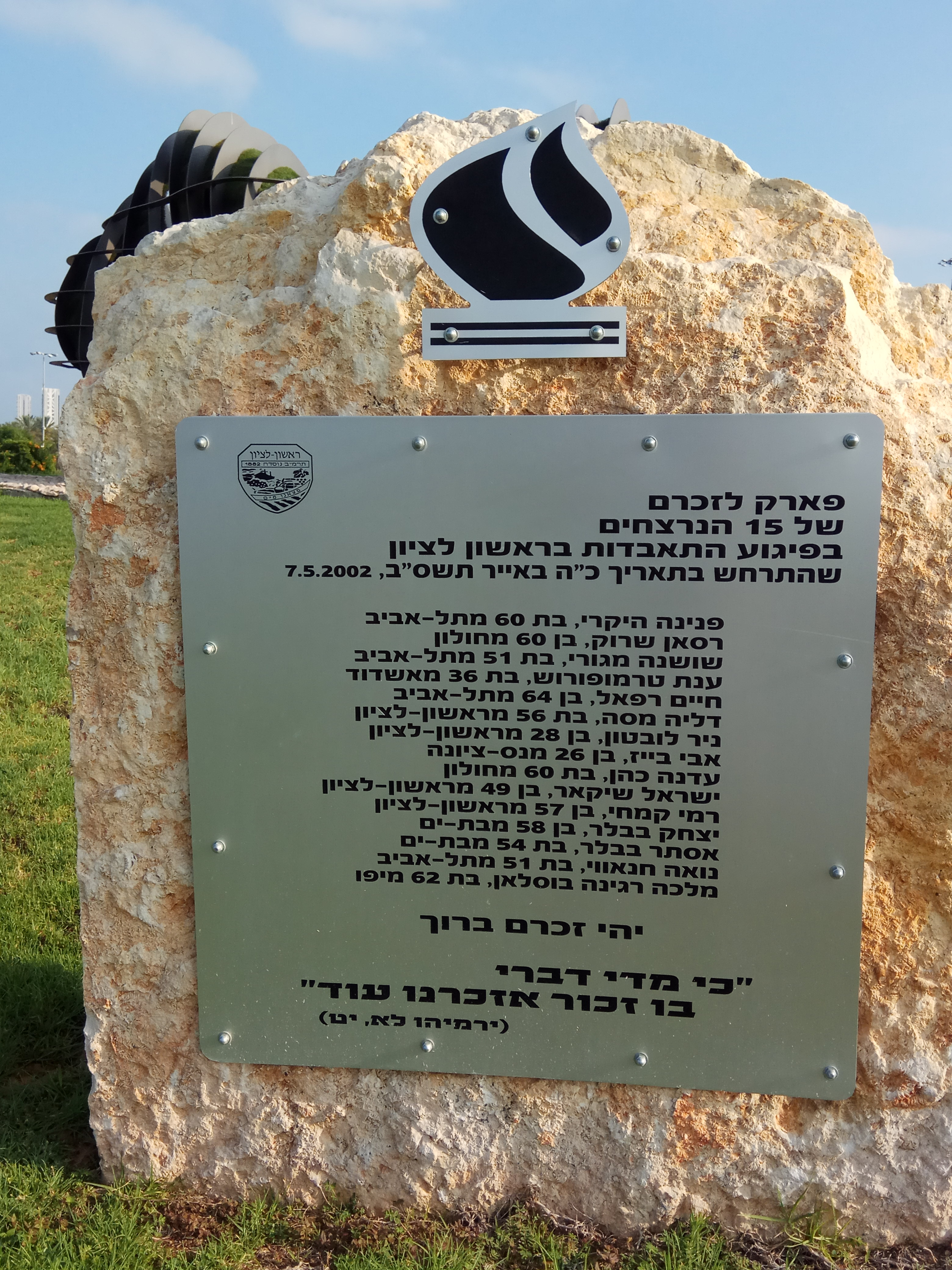
Memorial for the attack victims

The attack was condemned by United Nations Secretary General Kofi Annan.

After the attack, Irina Polishchuk, a Ukrainian married to Palestinian-Arab Ibrahim Sarahne, was caught and convicted of participating in the 2002 Rishon LeZion bombing for her part in delivering the bomber to the site of the attack.

=== Release of attack collaborator ===
On 18 October 2011, Polishchuk, who had originally been sentenced to 20 years imprisonment, was released to the West Bank as part of the Gilad Shalit prisoner exchange between Israel and Hamas.
