= Nile TV International =

Egyptian television channel

- Country: Egypt
- Broadcast area: Middle East, Arab world, Africa, Europe, United States
- Headquarters: Cairo

Programming
- Picture format: 4:3 (576i, SDTV)

Ownership
- Owner: Egyptian Radio and Television Union (ERTU)

History
- Launched: 31 October 1994; 32 years ago

Nile TV International is an Egyptian satellite television news network. It is the first Arab satellite channel to broadcast its programs in foreign languages; English, French, and formerly Hebrew. Nile TV International broadcasts via four satellites, allowing its broadcast to reach the entire Arab world, the Middle East, Europe, and the United States.

The news network also broadcasts as a terrestrial channel on the UHF band. In July 2009, Nile TV International became formally part of the News Center of the Egyptian Radio and Television Union (ERTU).

== History ==
The channel began an experimental service in October 1993, in English and French, starting less than three years after the Egyptian Satelltie Channel. Its initial target was Europe, for which it was used as a means to boost Egypt-bound tourism.

=== Hebrew service ===
There used to be a two-hour daily Hebrew service, which started in January 2002. The broadcast could be viewed outside of Egyptian borders from 6:00 PM CAT to 8:00 PM CAT, and aimed to represent a pan-Arab view.

== Administration ==
The channel's current president is Sameh Ragaee, who was previously the president of the Al-Nile Al-Akhbar (Nile News) channel. He took the post in 2014. The former president, Dr. Mervat Mohsen, had to resign because of a mistake caused by the shift supervisor, who broadcast a documentary on former Egyptian president Mohamed Morsi.

=== Former presidents ===
- Hassan Hamed
- Halla Hashish
- Dr. Mervat Mohsen
- Nashwa Shalakany
- Mervat el-Kaffas
- Youssef Sherif Rizkallah

== Anchors and reporters ==
=== Current English anchors ===
- Nermin Nazim
- Hend Farrag
- Nesreen Bahaa El-Din
- Yasser Abdel Hakim
- Radwa Mobarak
- Hany Seif
- Mahetab El-Afandi
- Mayssa Maher
- Mohamed Abdel Rehim
- Ibrahim Kabeel
- Dina Hussein
- Hala El-Hamalawy
- Mona Sweilam
- Nancy Sarah Barakat
- Yasmin Bakir
- Lobna Yehia

=== Current English reporters ===
- Mona Moselhy
- Angy Maher
- Nermine Abdel Rahman
- Sally Lamloum
- Amira Mohsen
- Aya El-Batrawy
- Yasmine Ibrahim
- Karim Gamal El-Din

=== Former English anchors ===
- Bassel Sabri
- Nihal Saad
- Sami Zidan
- Ayman Salah
- Ahmed El-Naggar
- Shahira Amin
- Yousef Gamal El-Din

== Shows ==
- Panorama News
- Mondays
- Front Line
- Open to Question
- Arab Affairs
- Business World
- Nile Cruise
- Cairo Watch
- Egypt Today
