= Shahira Amin =

Egyptian journalist

Shahira Amin شهيرة أمين
- Occupations: Former Deputy Head of Nile TV; News anchor

Shahira Amin (Arabic: شهيرة أمين [ʃæˈhiːɾæ ʔæˈmiːn]) is an Egyptian journalist, the former deputy head of Egyptian state-owned Nile TV and one of its senior anchors. She resigned from the position on February 3, 2011. She said she quit over what she "considered to be its biased coverage" of the Egyptian Revolution of 2011.

== Gilad Shalit interview ==
Amin became the subject of criticism after she interviewed Israeli soldier Gilad Shalit on October 18, 2011 in Egypt, following Shalit's release from more than five years of captivity in Gaza but preceding his return to Israel and reunification with his family. Israeli officials and various commentators said the interview, which they alleged was held in the presence of armed, masked Hamas militants, broke the ethical rules of journalism and violated the terms of Shalit's release. Disputing that the interview was held in the presence of armed Hamas militants, Amin stated that it is "true that he was brought in by armed Hamas men, but in the room itself there were only Egyptian intelligence people. They didn't intervene, and neither did the Hamas men". She described the criticism as "incorrect" stating "I'm a journalist, and any journalist would want to conduct an interview that would be aired all over the world". Amin also defended the interview by saying that it was conducted "after he had been released by Hamas and had a medical checkup by the Red Cross." But a Red Cross spokesman later said that no such medical check-up took place.

== Awards and honors ==
Shahira Amin has been the recipient of numerous awards and honors, including the Global Thinkers Forum (GTF) 2013 Award for Excellence in Gender Equality.
