= Bushra al-Tawil =

Palestinian journalist and prisoners' rights activist

Bushra al-Tawil or Bushra al-Taweel (Arabic: بشرى الطويل) is a Palestinian journalist, former Palestinian prisoner and prisoners' rights activist from Ramallah who has frequently been held under administrative detention without charge by Israel. She is the spokesperson for the Aneen Al-Qaid Media Network, a local news agency specialized in covering news about the Palestinian detainees, and political prisoners.

== Education and career ==
Al-Tawil began studying journalism after she was first detained and released again by the Israeli authorities in 2011. She elected to study journalism and photography at the Modern University College in Ramallah, and graduated in 2013.

She went on to found the “Aneen ALQaid” news network, which looks at Palestinian captives, the experiences of their families, and the rights of female captives in Israeli prisons.

== Arrests and detention ==
Al-Tawil was arrested in 2011 at the age of 18 by Israeli authorities and sentenced to 16 months in prison but freed five months later as part of the Gilad Shalit prisoner exchange. On July 1, 2014 she was rearrested and had her former sentence reimposed by a military court, she served the remainder eleven months in prison. She was released in May 2015.

On November 1, 2017, she was arrested and on November 7 ordered to administrative detention, incarceration without trial or charge. She spent eight months in prison.

On December 11, 2019, she was arrested, after Israeli soldiers raided the Umm Al-Sharayet neighbourhood in al-Bireh. The arrest came less than a week after the release of her father, who had been held in administrative detention for two years. She was sentenced to administrative detention on December 16, for which she was held in the Hasharon prison in northern Israel.

On November 8, 2020, she was arrested on the road from Ramallah to Nablus, and in March 2021 her period of administrative detention was extended by four months. Her father, a former mayor of Al-Bireh and a Hamas leader, began a hunger strike demanding his daughter's release. Al-Tawil credited her father's strike for her release.

She was arrested on March 22, 2022, in Nablus.

== Family ==
Al-Tawil's father is Jamal al-Tawil, a prominent Hamas leader, former mayor of Al-Bireh, and former prisoner and has spent many years in prison. She has three brothers.
