= Arab–Israeli peace projects =

Arab–Israeli peace projects are projects to promote peace and understanding between the Arab League and Israel in different spheres. These are part of a broader attempt at a peace process between Palestinians and Israelis. Sponsors of such projects can be found both in Israel and Palestine.

== Joint economic efforts and businesses ==
Israeli–Palestinian economic peace efforts are efforts to promote joint economic projects and efforts between Israelis and Palestinians as a pathway to reach peace between the two groups. They are based partially on official efforts and projects by the governments of Israel and the Palestinian Authority, and partially on private efforts by individual companies and business people who seek to promote various ventures which promote economic unity and collaboration between the two sides.

This involves ongoing joint efforts by regional leaders to launch joint new industrial and economic projects, which will create new local businesses and job growth, and promote ongoing cooperation. It is an official joint effort of the Israeli, Palestinian and Jordanian governments to promote economic cooperation, and new business initiatives which can help both sides work together, and create a better diplomatic atmosphere and better economic conditions. It constitutes a co-existence project, as it is mainly designed to foster efforts in the private sector, once governments provide the initial investment and facilities.

In early 2010, President Shimon Peres took an active and personal role in efforts to promote local business initiatives. Peres personally led a tour of top Israeli executives through the West Bank, and told them about many new Palestinian businesses which show much growth potential. One company highlighted by Peres was the New Generation Technology incubator, a joint Jewish-Arab effort founded in 2002 which encourages new ideas and projects in technology and biotechnology.

=== Joint industrial parks ===
One major idea is the creation of industrial parks where Israelis and Palestinians can work together. In 2011, according to Naftali Bennett, there were about 50 factories in the West Bank industrial region where Jews and Palestinians were working together.

=== Local efforts and implementation ===
Gilboa region

Joint economic cooperation between Israeli officials in Gilboa and Palestinian officials in Jenin has begun to have major results and benefits. In October 2009, a new project got underway promoting tourism and travel between the two areas. Major new business efforts and tourist attractions have been initiated in Jenin. The two regions are planning a joint industrial zone which would bridge the border. Palestinians would produce locally made handicrafts and sell them through Gilboa to other regions of the world. Another possible project is a joint language center, where Israelis and Palestinians would teach each other Arabic and Hebrew, as well as aspects of their cultural heritage.

=== Valley of Peace initiative ===
The Valley of Peace initiative is an effort to promote economic cooperation between Israel, Jordan and Palestinians. It was initially centered around efforts and joint projects in the Arava/Arabah Valley, along which runs the southern portion of the Israel–Jordan border.

The idea for this project began in 2005, when Israel, Jordan and the Palestinian Authority asked the World Bank to analyze the feasibility of this idea.

The Valley of Peace initiative began with a joint proposal in 2008 for a number of water-related initiatives. The study concluded in 2013, and an agreement was signed in 2013 by Israel, Jordan, and the Palestinian Authority to move ahead with the plan.

The "Red-Dead" project to build a canal from the Red Sea to the Dead Sea was originally conceived and created within the Valley of Peace Initiative. It was officially referred to within that plan as the "Peace Carrier."

==== Red-Dead project ====
In early 2015, Israel and Jordan signed a major agreement to carry out the "Red-Dead" project, and to address the major regional problems of acute shortage of clean fresh water in Jordan, and the rapid contraction of the Dead Sea. A new desalination plant to be built near the Jordanian tourist resort of Aqaba would convert salt water from the Red Sea into fresh water for use in southern Israel and southern Jordan; each region would get eight billion to 13 billion gallons a year. This process would produces about as much brine as a waste product; the brine would be piped more than 100 miles to help replenish the Dead Sea, already known for its high salt content. This would reinforce the status of the Dead Sea as an important economic resource to both nations, in multiple areas including tourism, industry and business.

In December 2015, Israel and Jordan formally released the technical plans to move ahead with this project. In May 2016, Israel and Jordan presented their plan for a Red Sea-Dead Sea canal to the World Bank and other potential investors.

In July 2017, Israel and the Palestinian Authority announced a new deal to provide drinking water for millions of Palestinians, as part of the Red-Dead project between Israel, Jordan and Palestinians to build a 220-kilometer (137-mile) pipeline to convey water from the Red Sea to the Dead Sea. Also, the water in this canal will generate electricity for local towns, and will also power a desalination plant to produce drinking water.

=== Israeli-Palestinian Chamber of Commerce ===
The Israeli-Palestinian Chamber of Commerce was founded in 2009. Its chairman is Eival Gilady, and its CEO is Ofir Gendelman. It has already held its first conference, at which Tony Blair was the keynote speaker. It is dedicated to promoting development of joint economic initiatives and businesses.

=== Sikkuy ===
Sikkuy, public service organization founded in 1991, runs Ramadan tours for Jewish Israelis.

== Policy groups ==
The following are organizations or institutions which address and analyze policy issues in a wide range of areas, as well as major projects or efforts which are officially carried out by regional institutions, governments, or NGOs.

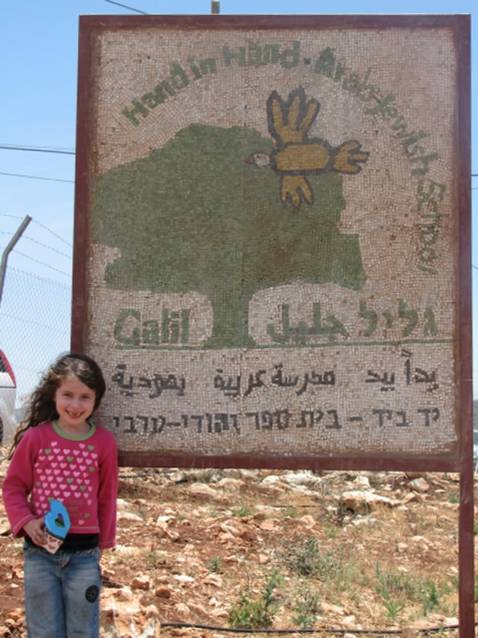
Sign in front of the Galil school, a joint Arab–Jewish primary school in Israel

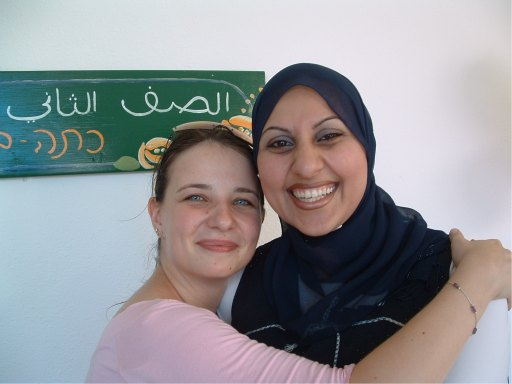
Teachers of Hand in Hand

=== Alliance for Middle East Peace (ALLMEP) ===
The Alliance for Middle East Peace (ALLMEP) is a group comprising over 70 leading non-governmental organizations that work to foster reconciliation between Israelis and Palestinians, as well as Arabs and Jews in the Middle East.

One of ALLMEP's proposals is an independent International Fund for Israeli-Palestinian Peace to support and encourage efforts to build peace in the region.

=== EcoPeace / Friends of the Earth Middle East ===
EcoPeace/Friends of the Earth Middle East is an organization which brings together environmental activists from Israel, Jordan and the Palestinian Territories, to work on common issues.

One of FOEME's major efforts is a regional advocacy project to promote discussion and sharing of water resources.

=== Mejdi ===
Middle East Justice and Development Initiatives (Mejdi) is a local grassroots Palestinian organization which was founded by Aziz Abu Sarah, a young Palestinian activist who seeks to advocate cooperation and reconciliation efforts. Mejdi seeks to promote dialogue between Israelis and Palestinians. one part of its peacemaking efforts is to promote local economic development, and strengthening of economic cooperation and Palestinian small businesses. Abu Sarah has been consistently involved in a range of workshops and efforts in which he has promoted greater efforts towards reconciliation and dialogue between individual Israelis and Palestinians.

=== Peres Center for Peace ===
Peres Center for Peace was founded by Shimon Peres and carries out various policy analyses to advance efforts for peace.

=== IPCRI – Israel/Palestine Center for Research and Information ===
IPCRI - Israel/Palestine Center for Research and Information is a joint Israeli/Palestinian NGO and public policy think tank based in Jerusalem working towards building partnerships in Israel/Palestine. Under shared Israeli-Palestinian leadership, IPCRI carries out research and projects in various fields from economic development to environmental sustainability. IPCRI also facilitates public outreach and track two negotiations between Israelis and Palestinians.

=== Aix Group ===
Formed in 2002, the Aix Group is an Israeli-Palestinian-international economic study team that conducts research on the economic dimension of the conflict. Areas of focus include Palestinian refugees, the construction of a territorial link between the Gaza Strip and the West Bank, development of the Jordan Valley, infrastructure cooperation, the economic status of Jerusalem.

=== Givat Haviva's Jewish-Arab Center for Peace ===
Givat Haviva is an education, research and documentation center, founded in 1949 by Ha'Kibbutz Ha'Arzi Federation; it is located in the northern Sharon Valley of Israel. According to its website "The mission of Givat Haviva today is to cope with the major issues that are on the agenda of Israeli society, and to foster educational initiatives, research and community work in the fields of peace, democracy, coexistence, tolerance and social solidarity."

Givat Haviva sponsors the Jewish-Arab Center for Peace. "Established in 1963, the Jewish-Arab Center for Peace is one of the oldest and most prominent institutions in its field. The common bond of the dozens of projects conducted in the Center is the struggle for better relations between Arabs and Jews, better understanding of the essence of democracy and citizens' rights in Israel, and building bridges with our Arab neighbors." One of the center's leading dialogue projects is Face to Face.

== Co-existence foundations and groups ==
Organizations which promote a variety of efforts and projects aimed at promoting co-existence and dialogue between the two sides.

=== Roots/Judur/Shorashim: The Palestinian Israeli Initiative for Understanding, Nonviolence, and Reconciliation ===
At the start of 2014, community activists Ali Abu Awwad and Rabbi Hanan Schlesinger, along with others, formed "Roots", a group based in the West Bank area of Gush Etzion to promote dialog and eventually trust between Israelis and Palestinian as a path to peace. The group's full name is Roots/Judur/Shorashim: The Palestinian Israeli Initiative for Understanding, Nonviolence, and Reconciliation, and was initially situated on Awwad's family's land near the village of Beit Ummar in the West Bank.

The Roots project organizes meetings between Israelis and Palestinians who live near each other in the West Bank in order to create dialogue. The project's outreach program includes monthly meetings between Israeli and Palestinian families, a women's group, work with school children, engaging local leaders, a summer camp, language learning, and cultural exchanges. In order to accommodate this wide variety of activities, a centrally located site in the Gush Etzion area of the West Bank is used as a convenient meeting area.

Ali Abu Awwad is a Palestinian activist and pacifist. He is the founder of Al Tariq (The Way) and a member of the Bereaved Families Forum, and tours the world together with Robi Damelin, a Jewish woman whose son was killed by a Palestinian sniper, to encourage dialogue and reconciliation between Palestinians and Israelis. His life and work has been featured in two award-winning films, Encounter Point and Forbidden Childhood. He lives in Beit Ummar, near Hebron.

Ali Abu Awwad, whose brother died in the conflict, attends many meetings with local Jewish residents. One of the first such meetings of his occurred in July 2014, between local Israeli and Palestinians within one part of the Etzion bloc in the West Bank.

=== Rabbis for Human Rights ===
Rabbis for Human Rights is an Israeli human rights organization that describes itself as "the rabbinic voice of conscience in Israel, giving voice to the Jewish tradition of human rights". Their membership includes Reform, Orthodox, Conservative and Reconstructionist rabbis and students. According to their web site, the organization includes "over one hundred ordained rabbis and rabbinical students". The organization received the Niwano Peace Prize in 2006.

RHR is best known for dispatching volunteers to act as human shields to protect the Palestinian olive harvest from vandalism and assault by settlers living on nearby land; every year, clashes are reported between settlers and Palestinian farmers. In 2008, the volunteer effort encompassed 40 villages. The effort was launched in 2002 when a Palestinian peace activist solicited RHR's help to protect olive pickers against attacks by settlers living near the village of Yanun.

RHR opposes the construction of the Israeli West Bank barrier in any place where it entails the expropriation of Arab-owned land, the division of villages, or cutting farmers off from their fields. RHR achieved a major victory in 2006 when it won a lawsuit to prevent the division by the fence of the village of Sheikh Sa'ad.

=== Ta'ayush Arab–Jewish Partnership ===
Formed in the fall of 2000, Ta'ayush (Arabic for "coexistence") is a grassroots movement of Arabs and Jews working to break down the walls of racism and segregation. It engages in daily actions of solidarity to end the Israeli occupation of the Palestinian territories and to achieve full civil equality for all Israeli citizens.

=== Coalition of Women for Peace ===
The Coalition of Women for Peace (Hebrew: קואליציית נשים לשלום) is an umbrella organization of women's groups in Israel, established in November 2000. It describes itself as "a feminist organization against the occupation of Palestine and for a just peace.". CWP says that it is "committed to ending the occupation and creating a more just society, while enhancing women's inclusion and participation in the public discourse".

The groups that founded the Coalition of Women for Peace are Machsom Watch, Noga Feminist Journal, Women in Black, The Fifth Mother, TANDI, Bat Shalom, New Profile and NELED.

The Coalition of Women for Peace came to an agreement on their principles for a solution of the Israeli-Palestinian conflict at a conference in Nazareth in November 2000.

=== The Parents Circle-Families Forum ===
The Parents Circle-Families Forum (PC-FF) is a grassroots organization of Palestinian and Israeli families who have lost immediate family members due to the conflict. Together, they transform their pain and bereavement into the catalyst for a joint mission of reconciliation and coexistence in the midst of ongoing violence.

PC-FF was founded in 1994 by Yitzhak Frankenthal whose son Arik was killed by the Hamas. Today, PC-FF includes more than 500 members, half Israeli and half Palestinian. The members conduct dialogue sessions, give lectures, and engage in projects to support tolerance and reconciliation.

Parents Circle creates innovative projects to spread its message of hope and reconciliation. The Forum firmly believes that without reconciliation, there will only be a cease fire and not peace. PC-FF members from Israel and the Palestinian Territories regularly meet even under nearly impossible circumstances such as right after the Gaza war of 2008–09.

The PC-FF's flagship program for the general public is its educational program. High school "Dialogue Encounters" bring two forum members, one Israeli and one Palestinian to classrooms in Israel, East Jerusalem and the West Bank to talk to students about the possibility of peace and reconciliation. Close to 40,000 students are reached each year.

=== Ir Shalem co-existence program ===
In many ways the city of Jerusalem has been at the center of the conflict. The Israeli political movement Peace Now in 1994 has created an initiative called Ir Shalem, the goal of which is to build a peaceful equitable and inspiring future for this city, with Jewish and Arab citizens working together to find solutions based on equity and justice. This program brings together volunteer architects, planners, lawyers and other professionals to analyze problems, and offer solutions. Among other efforts, Ir Shalem is developing the first-ever planning model for East Jerusalem that will equitably meet the needs of the Palestinian community.

=== Seeds of Peace ===
Founded in 1993, Seeds of Peace brings together hundreds of emerging young leaders and educators from conflict regions at the Seeds of Peace Camp in Otisfield, Maine, USA, including thousands of Israeli, Palestinian, Jordanian, and Egyptian teens. The mission of Seeds of Peace is to inspire and cultivate new generations of leaders in communities divided by conflict. There are over 6,000 graduates of the Camp from 27 countries.

=== Children of Peace ===
Children of Peace is a UK-based, non-partisan, international conflict-resolution charity that aims to build friendship, trust and reconciliation between Israeli and Palestinian children, aged 4–17 regardless of community, culture, faith, gender or heritage through arts, education, healthcare and sports projects and programmes, so that a future generation and their communities might live in peace, side-by-side.

Founded in 2004 by the charity's president, Richard Martin, Children of Peace receives personal support from world leaders including Pope Francis, American Vice-president Joe Biden, Quartet Envoy Tony Blair, British Prime Minister David Cameron, British Deputy Prime Minister Nick Clegg, British Labour Leader Ed Miliband, Bill Clinton, French President François Hollande, former mayor of Hebron Khaled Osaily and Palestinian Envoy to the UK Dr Manuel Houssassian. Three UK parliamentarians from each major political party are Goodwill Ambassadors – Louise Ellman MP, Toby Ellwood MP and Ed Davey MP.

In 2012, one of the charity's Goodwill Ambassadors & Director of its youth ambassador programme, Sally Becker carried the Olympic Flag into the stadium at the Opening Ceremony of London 2012, in Children of Peace's name. Currently there are 20 Youth Ambassadors, from Armenia, Israel, Palestine, Qatar, the UK and the United States.

The charity's approach is to build understanding between grassroots communities in the region. The charity works with more than 140 affiliate organisations in a unique Coalition of Peace in Gaza, Egypt, Israel, Jordan, Lebanon, Turkey and the West Bank (and in every continent).

== Localized co-existence efforts ==
Specific efforts and specific projects, localized and otherwise, aimed at promoting co-existence and dialogue between the two sides.

=== Olives of Peace ===
Olives of Peace is a joint Israeli-Palestinian business venture to sell olive oil. Through this project, Israelis and Palestinians have carried out joint training sessions and planning. It has also led to Palestinian oil production being enriched by Israeli components. It has produced olive oil which has been sold under the brand name "Olives of Peace." This is related to Peace Oil (UK) and Peace Oil (USA).

=== Neve Shalom-Wahat Al-Salam (Oasis of Peace) ===
The Israeli Jewish-Israeli Muslim Village of Neve Shalom – Wāħat as-Salām (NSWAS) means "Oasis of Peace" in Hebrew and Arabic. NSWAS provides a remarkable model of longterm coexistence. Formed in 1970 on land donated by the Roman Catholic Church, NSWAS sits between Jerusalem and Tel Aviv. They organize humanitarian projects, including providing medical assistance for Palestinians.

They also run several schools, two for village and other area children, and they have a training facility called the School for Peace. The children's classes run from pre-school through Middle School and are all taught by both Muslims and Jews in their native languages. The School for Peace however is designed for adult Arabs and Jews from all over the area to learn about each other in controlled seminars run by trained Peace Facilitators.

NSWAS has had many notable visitors over the years. Jimmy Carter, Hillary Clinton, and many others including Roger Waters (from Pink Floyd) who has performed several benefit concerts in the small village urging Israel to "Tear Down the WALL!"

An American branch recently incorporated under the name "American Friends of Neve Shalom" they are a non-profit 501(c)3 organization that raises funds in the US for NSWAS programs (similar support groups also exist in the EU, and elsewhere).

=== Hamidrasha Jewish-Arab Beit Midrash ===
Hamidrasha, a center for study and fellowship, works to address alienation, estrangement, and mutual ignorance between Jews and Arabs. Hamidrasha is establishing an inter-cultural Beit Midrash (Hebrew, "House of study"), which will serve as a basis for mutual personal and communal encounters, and for the study of cultural narratives and modern texts of both peoples. Jewish, Muslim and Christian men and women will engage in a true inter-cultural learning experience, with the goal of making a significant contribution to the ongoing dialogue between Jews and Arabs, and strengthening their reciprocal ties.

=== Green Action ===
Green Action is an Israeli non-governmental organization which advocates for environmental activism and social change, and has brought fair trade and organic Palestinian olive oil to the Israeli market. Avi Levi, the director, travels frequently to the West Bank to work with Palestinian farmers, helping them set up and maintain cooperatives and obtain organic and fair trade certification. The products are packaged under the SAHA label. SAHA is an acronym for Sachar Hogen, fair trade in Hebrew, and is also the Arabic word, Saha, meaning well-being or good health.

In addition to olive oil, the main agricultural product of Palestinians in the West Bank, Green Action also sells za'atar, dibbes, organic fruit jam, herbal infusion and pressed olives. The olive oil is also sold in bulk worldwide including to Australia and the US. In the US, Olive Branch Enterprises of Seattle, Washington buys Green Action in bulk and bottles it under the Peace Oil label.

=== Oseh Shalom – Sanea al-Salam Palestinian-Jewish Family Peacemakers Camp ===
From 2003 to 2007, the Jewish-Palestinian Living Room Dialogue Group partnered with Camp Tawonga over five-years to bring hundreds of adults and youth from 50 different towns in Palestine and Israel to successfully live and communicate together at the Palestinian-Jewish Family Peacemakers Camp—Oseh Shalom – Sanea al-Salam.

== Cultural and scientific works and groups ==
=== Arab Israeli Dialogue ===
Lionel Rogosin filmed Arab Israeli Dialogue in 1973, an early attempt at unlocking the cultural and political issues between Palestinians and Israelis. It is a filmed debate between the Palestinian poet Rashed Hussein and Amos Kenan, shot in New-York as they were both exiled.

=== Israeli-Palestinian Science Organization ===
The Israeli-Palestinian Science Organization is a nongovernmental nonprofit established in 2004 to support collaborative research between scientists in Israel and Palestine. Founding members of IPSO include Nobel prize winning neuroscientist Torsten Wiesel.

=== The West-Eastern Divan ===
Founded in 1998 by Israeli-Argentinian pianist and conductor Daniel Barenboim and Palestinian-American author Edward Said, the West-Eastern Divan (named after an anthology of poems by Johann Wolfgang von Goethe) promotes a cultural dialogue between Israelis and Arabs. A principal activity is an orchestra composed mostly of young Israeli and Arab musicians, who are demonstrating the potential for collaboration between the two cultures on the universal ideas that are communicated by great classical music. They have performed throughout the world. Barenboim has also made this point by going into Palestinian areas and giving piano recitals and master classes.

=== Comedy For Peace ===
Comedy for Peace is a non-political effort to use humor to build trust, understanding and a vision for peace between Palestinians and Israelis.

Comedy for Peace was conceived and is being organized by Ray Hanania, a Palestinian-American stand-up comedian – who is married to a Jewish woman. It is Ray's hope that the power of comedy combined with the power of two peoples coming together on one stage will help Palestinians and Israelis find the courage to look past the pain and the suffering of the conflict and see each other as human beings, as partners and as people who have no other choice but to struggle together to achieve a lasting peace.

=== Tolerance Monument ===
A Tolerance Monument sculpted by Czesław Dźwigaj in collaboration with Michal Kubiak is situated on a hill marking the divide between Jewish Armon HaNetziv and Arab Jabel Mukaber, standing opposite the United Nations headquarters in Jerusalem in a park near Goldman Promenade. Unveiled in Jerusalem in 2008, it was funded by Polish businessman Aleksander Gudzowaty as a symbol to promote peace in the Israeli–Palestinian conflict.

=== NeuroBridges ===
NeuroBridges is series of workshops, held in Europe, that began in 2014 aiming to bring together Arab and Israeli neuroscientists in order to promote scientific collaborations and develop personal relations that can help alleviate political distress. NeuroBridges was initiated by the Israeli neuroscientist Yonatan Loewenstein and the Egyptian neuroscientist Ahmed El Hady.

=== SESAME ===
The Synchrotron-Light for Experimental Science and Applications in the Middle East (SESAME) is an independent laboratory located in Allan in the Balqa governorate of Jordan, created under the auspices of UNESCO on 30 May 2002.

Aimed at promoting peace between Middle Eastern countries, Jordan was chosen as the location for the laboratory, as it was then the only country that maintained diplomatic relations with all the other founding members; Bahrain, Cyprus, Egypt, Iran, Israel, Pakistan, the Palestinian Authority, and Turkey. The project was launched in 1999 and the ground breaking ceremony was held on 6 January 2003. Construction work began the following July, with a scheduled completion date of 2015. However financial and technical infrastructural obstacles forced the project to be delayed. The laboratory was inaugurated on 16 May 2017 under the patronage and presence of King Abdullah II.

The project cost around $90 million, with $5 million donated each by Jordan, Israel, Turkey, Iran and the European Union. The rest was donated by CERN from existing equipment. Jordan became the greatest contributor to the project by donating land and building construction costs, and by pledging to build a $7 million solar power plant, which will make SESAME the first accelerator in the world to be powered by renewable energy. The annual operational cost of $6 million are pledged by the members according to the size of their economies.

== Educational efforts ==
=== MEET – Middle East Education through Technology ===
Middle East Education Through Technology (MEET) is an innovative educational initiative aimed at creating a common professional language between Israeli and Palestinian youth. Working together with the Massachusetts Institute of Technology (MIT), MEET enables its participants to acquire advanced technological and leadership tools while empowering them to create positive social change within their own communities.

Program founders Yaron Binur, Anat Binur, and Assaf Harlap became aware that many Israelis and Palestinians never get a chance to interact with one another on a personal level, even though they grow up and live a few short miles from one another. Inspired by their experiences of multicultural cooperation in international educational institutions, the founders decided that a fast-paced, intensive program in technology would be an ideal medium to bridge the divide. With this vision, they created MEET in the summer of 2004.

MEET seeks excelling Palestinian and Israeli high school students; admission into the program is very competitive. Once admitted, students meet continuously for three years. Their first summer includes instruction in basic Java programming; this extends into the first yearlong segment of the program. The second summer includes more advanced topics in computer science and introduces a business and entrepreneurship curriculum. The program is capped by a long-term project beginning in the second yearlong segment and extending into a final summer term. Alumni activities maintain the student network after graduation.

MEET graduates have been accepted into top universities in the region and abroad, including the Massachusetts Institute of Technology. The skills and bonds of friendship forged by MEET students, combined with the students' natural talents, prepare them for a successful future of leadership, achievement, innovation, and cooperation.

Aside from its partnership with MIT, MEET has been supported by the Hebrew University of Jerusalem (which has donated lab space for the summer sessions since MEET's inception), Al-Quds University, Sun Microsystems, Hewlett-Packard, and other national and international organizations, as well as many individual volunteers from around the world.

=== Hand in Hand Bilingual Arab-Jewish Schools ===
Hand in Hand runs a network of four bilingual (Arabic and Hebrew) schools that serve more than 800 students in Jerusalem, the Galilee (Galil Jewish-Arab School), Wadi Ara (Hand in Hand "Gesher al HaWadi" School) and Be'er Sheva (the Hagar School). Half the students are Palestinian citizens of Israel, and the other half are Jewish citizens of Israel. Students study in both languages simultaneously, and plans call for an eventual expansion to the 12th grade.

=== The Arava Institute for Environmental Studies ===
The Arava Institute for Environmental Studies is an environmental studies and research program, located in Kibbutz Ketura, Israel. The institute's mission is to advance cross-border environmental cooperation in the face of political conflict. Under the motto "nature knows no borders", the Arava Institute brings together Israelis, Palestinians, Jordanians and other international students and researchers to enable them to cooperatively solve the region's environmental challenges.

In the Arava Institute's academic program, the participants study a variety of interdisciplinary courses ranging from sustainable agriculture, through waste management, to political ecology; as well as engage in a weekly peace-building leadership seminar that serves as a platform to address the Arab-Israeli conflict, and seeks to provide them with tools for open dialogue and conflict resolution.

In addition, the Arava Institute holds a number of research centers that engage in transboundary scientific work in the fields of water management, sustainable agriculture, conservation, renewable energy, and sustainable development.

== Political activists and community groups ==
Groups of political activists or community activists who work for peace through efforts based on political goals and measures, or community efforts. Includes some groups which are composed of activists from one side of the conflict, and some groups which include activists from both sides.

=== Combatants for Peace ===
Combatants for Peace (Hebrew: לוחמים לשלום) is an organization of Israelis and Palestinians who are veterans of armed conflict, and have concluded that there can be no solution through violence. The Israeli members served as combat soldiers in the Israel Defense Forces, while the Palestinian members "were involved in acts of violence in the name of Palestinian liberation."

The organization, founded in 2005, supports a two-state solution to the conflict. A statement on their website says, "We call for the establishment of a Palestinian State, alongside the State of Israel. The two states can exist in peace and security beside each other."

=== Jews for Israeli-Palestinian Peace ===
Jews for Israeli–Palestinian Peace (Swedish: Judar för israelisk-palestinsk fred), abbreviated as JIPF, is a Stockholm-based association, founded by Swedish Jews in 1982, following the Israeli invasion of Lebanon.

JIPF states that they want to work for a "fair and lasting peace" in the conflict between Israelis and Palestinians, based on national self-determination and independence for both peoples. Its political programme include demands for a creation of a Palestinian state, Israel's withdrawal from all territories occupied in 1967, the dismantlement of Israeli settlements and that the Palestinian refugee question must be based on the principle of the right of return or economic compensation.

With a grant from the Helena Berings Minnesfond (English: Helena Berings Memorial Fund) the group co-ran a school program in partnership with the Palestinian Association of Sweden. The program facilitated dialogues between Palestinians and Jews in approximately fifty schools over three years.

=== Women Wage Peace ===
After the Gaza War in 2014, a group of Israeli women founded the Women Wage Peace movement with the goal of reaching a bilaterally acceptable political peace agreement between Israel and Palestine. While based mainly in Israel, the movement has worked to build connections with Palestinians, reaching out to women and men of many different religions and political backgrounds. The group's activities have included a collective hunger strike outside Israeli Prime Minister Benjamin Netanyahu's formal residence and a protest march from Northern Israel to Jerusalem. As of May 2017, Women Wage Peace had over 20,000 members and supporters associated with it.

== Arab-Israeli peace diplomacy and treaties ==
- Paris Peace Conference, 1919
- Faisal–Weizmann Agreement (1919)
- 1949 Armistice Agreements
- Camp David Accords (1978)
- Egypt–Israel peace treaty (1979)
- Madrid Conference of 1991
- Oslo Accords (1993)
- Israel–Jordan peace treaty (1994)
- Camp David 2000 Summit
- Israeli–Palestinian peace process
- List of Middle East peace proposals
- International law and the Arab–Israeli conflict

== Jewish-Muslim dialogue ==
=== The American Jewish Committee ===
While forcefully speaking out against Islamic anti-Semitism and anti-Israeli rhetoric, the American Jewish Committee (AJC) has worked since 1985 to enhance relations between Jews and Muslims. The AJC encourages and engages in dialogue on many levels with like-minded groups committed to fostering tolerance and cooperation.

Their website states that "The American Jewish Committee has demonstrated a profound commitment to enhancing relations between Jews and Muslims, a vital part of its fundamental dedication to the promotion of interreligious understanding in the United States and around the world. Rejecting the inevitability of a "clash of civilizations," AJC has instead insisted on the possibility of a "community of civilizations" by encouraging dialogue on the highest levels with like-minded groups committed to fostering tolerance and cooperation. In so doing, we have achieved a number of breakthroughs in this vital arena. For well over a decade, AJC has dedicated itself to forging significant relationships with Arab and Muslim leaders around the world. AJC has traveled extensively in the Muslim world – from Morocco to Mauritania, through the Middle East and the Gulf states, to Indonesia. We have met with scores of Muslim leaders, including top officials of Egypt, Turkey, Jordan, Tunisia, Bosnia, Kuwait, Qatar, Malaysia, and Indonesia, to discuss topics ranging from relations with Israel and the United States to the promotion of international Muslim-Jewish dialogue." Seeking to advance Jewish-Muslim relations

In 1986 the AJC publicly condemned the murder by bomb attack of Alex Odeh (in Oct. 1985), a leader of the American-Arab Anti-Discrimination Committee in Santa Ana, California. The AJC had a meeting with the Federal Bureau of Investigation director William Webster about this incident; they urged action to identify and punish those responsible for anti-Arab bigotry. In 1986 the AJC submitted testimony to the United States House of Representatives, Subcommittee on Criminal Justice, on the topic of violence and discrimination towards Arab-Americans.

In 1991, on the brink of the Allied war against Iraq, the AJC issued a statement warning the public not to engage in discrimination towards American Arabs or Muslims. In part, they stated, "We are ever mindful of what happened to Japanese-Americans as a result of war hysteria shortly after Japan attacked Pearl Harbor in 1941. Some 120,000 Japanese-Americans, two-thirds of whom were American citizens, were evacuated and incarcerated in internment camps... without any evidence whatsoever that they were a threat to U.S. security. This must not happen again." (AJC statement by executive director David Harris)

From 1992 to 1995 the AJC worked to lobby the United States government to intervene on behalf of Muslims in Bosnia.

In 1993 the AJC sponsored the first national conference on "Muslims and Jews in North America: Past, Present and Future" with the Institute for Islamic-Judaic Studies at University of Denver in October. In 1994 they sponsored the second such conference. The third conference had to be canceled, when the AJC could not found Muslim partners who were willing to publicly condemn the current wave of terrorist attacks on Israel.

In 1999 the AJC helped aid Muslims in Kosovo.

In 2001 the AJC initiated a new project designed to advance understanding between Muslims and Jews by publishing two books: Children of Abraham: An Introduction to Judaism for Muslims, by Professor Reuven Firestone, a scholar of Islam at Hebrew Union College in Los Angeles, was written to describe Judaism to Muslims; Children of Abraham: An Introduction to Islam for Jews, by professor Khalid Duran, was written to describe Islam for Jews.

=== Children of Abraham ===
Children of Abraham seeks to build an international community of Muslim and Jewish youth that celebrates their religious identities. Through an engaging project involving a photographic exploration of Jewish and Muslim communities around the world, and honest, unflinching online dialogue, participants form a network of advocates and ambassadors for ground-breaking Muslim-Jewish relations in six continents.

=== Centre for the Study of Muslim-Jewish Relations ===
In July 2007 a new Centre for the Study of Muslim-Jewish Relations was opened in Cambridge, United Kingdom. It is partly financed by a £1 million contribution from Richard Stone, a Jewish philanthropist. In the first instance its students they will study common areas between the two religions. Eventually work will extend into more controversial areas, including the Israel–Palestine question.

== See also ==
- Israeli peace camp
- Religious pluralism
- Israeli–Palestinian peace process
- Pan-Semitism
- Bimkom
- Trade Unions Linking Israel and Palestine
- Middle East economic integration
- Peace discourse in the Israeli–Palestinian conflict
