= Sumaya Farhat Naser =

Palestinian peace activist

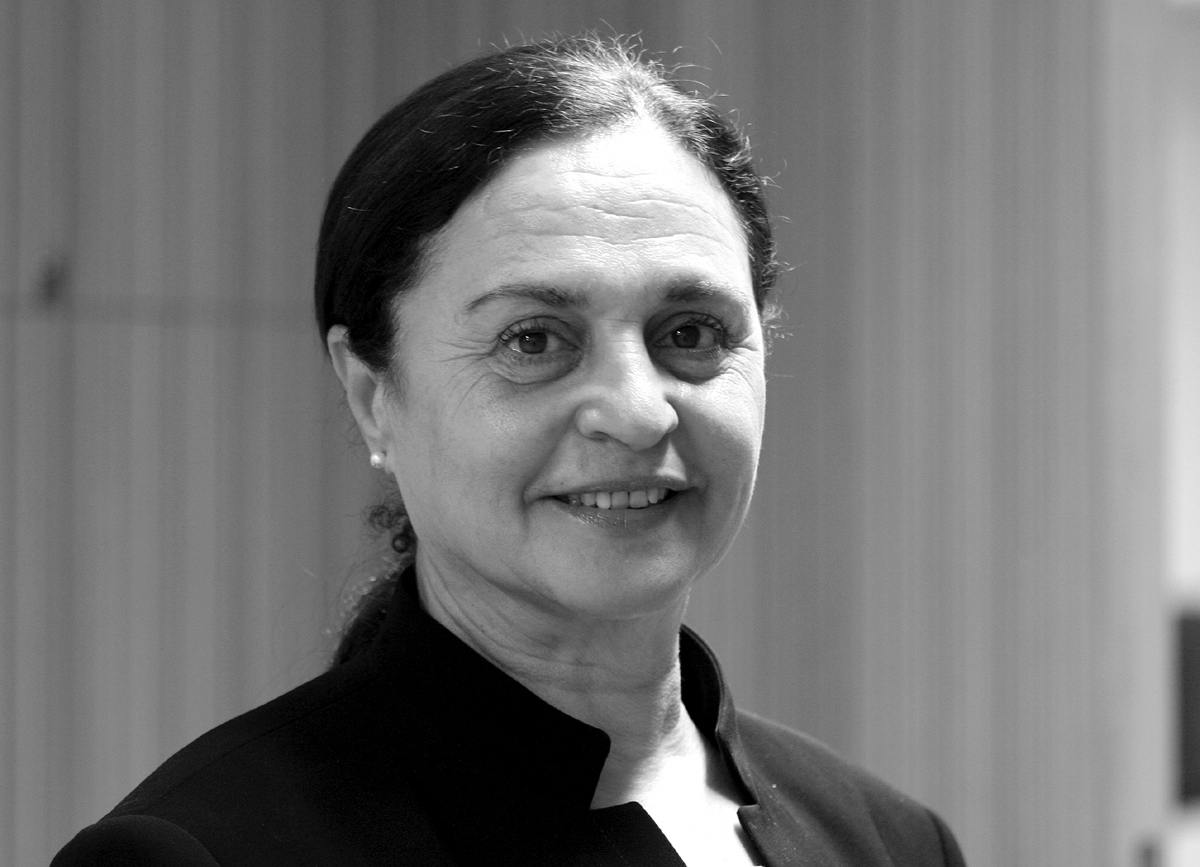
Sumaya Farhat Naser, 2008

Sumaya Farhat Naser (Arabic: سمية فرحات ناصر, born 11 June 1948 in Bir Zeit) is a Palestinian peace activist in the West Bank.

== Life ==
Born to a Palestinian Christian family, she attended Talitha Kumi, a boarding school in Beit Jala which was founded by Lutheran deaconesses in the 19th century. After gaining her university entrance qualification, she studied biology, geography and education at the University of Hamburg, Germany and received a doctor's degree in applied botany.

Between 1982 and 1997 she was a university lecturer in botany and ecology at the Palestinian Birzeit University north of Ramallah. Between 1997 and 2001 she was the manager of the Palestinian Jerusalem Center for Women, working for peace together with the Israeli group Bat Shalom.

Sumaya Farhat-Naser is known for her clear expressions of opinion in the media, and particularly for her various projects, in which she motivates Palestinian women to work on a peaceful resolution to the Israeli–Palestinian conflict.

== Publications ==
- Thymian und Steine (autobiography), Lenos Verlag, Basel 1995, ISBN 3-85787-657-3
- Daughter of the Olive Trees, Lenos Verlag, Basel 2003, ISBN 3-85787-340-X
- Disteln im Weinberg. Tagebuch aus Palästina, Lenos, Basel 2007, ISBN 978-3-85787-716-2
- Im Schatten des Feigenbaums, Lenos, Basel 2013, ISBN 978-3-85787-436-9
- Ein Leben für den Frieden, Lesebuch aus Palästina. Lenos, Basel 2017, ISBN 978-3-85787-479-6

== Awards ==
- 1989 Honorary Doctorate from the Theological Faculty of the University of Münster, Germany
- 1995 Bruno-Kreisky-Award for merits on Human Rights
- 1997 Mount Zion Award for Reconciliation
- 1997 Evangelical Book Award
- 2000 Peace Award of the City of Augsburg
- 2002 Hermann-Kesten-Medaille of the P.E.N.-Center
- 2002 Solidarity Award of the city of Bremen
- 2003 Profax-Preis of Pädagogische Hochschule Zürich
- 2011 AMOS-Prize for Civil Courage PNN
