= Peace Oil =

Peace Oil may refer to:

- Peace Oil (UK), brand of olive oil marketed in the UK, stated to be "produced in Israel by Jews, Arabs, Druze and Bedouin working together"
- Peace Oil (United States), American brand of olive oil marketed in cooperation with Israeli and Palestinian Fair Trade groups
