= Boston Children's Hospital =

Hospital in Massachusetts, U.S.

- Children’s Medical Center Corp.

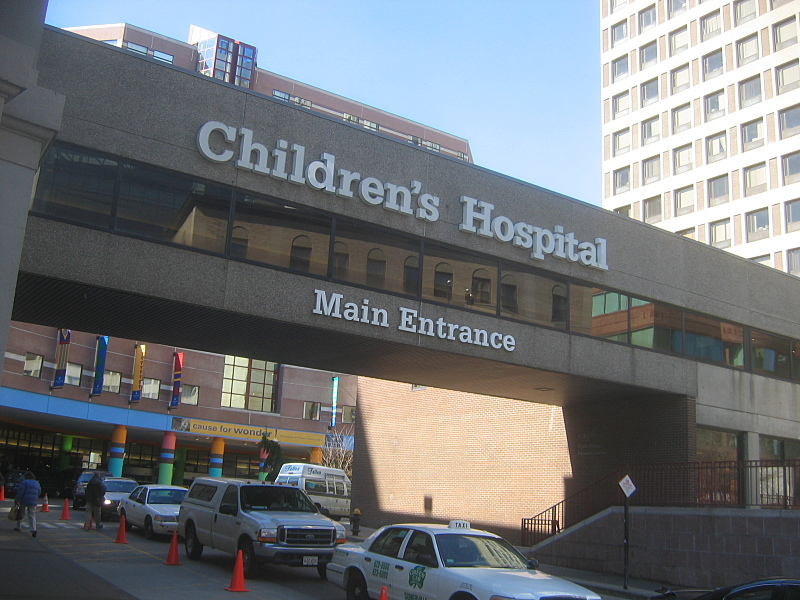
- Longwood Avenue main entrance

Geography
- Location: 300 Longwood Avenue, Boston, Massachusetts 02115, United States
- Coordinates: 42°20′14″N 71°06′23″W

Organization
- Care system: Private
- Type: Teaching & Research
- Affiliated university: Harvard Medical School/Harvard University

Services
- Emergency department: Level I Pediatric Trauma Center
- Beds: 485 licensed beds

History
- Founded: 1869; 157 years ago: Bus 8, 19, 47, 60, 65, CT2, CT3; Green Line D, E

Links
- Website: childrenshospital.org
- Lists: Hospitals in the United States

Boston Children's Hospital (formerly known as Children's Hospital Boston until 2013) is the main pediatric training and research hospital of Harvard Medical School, Harvard University. It is a nationally ranked, freestanding acute care children's hospital located at the centre of Longwood Medical and Academic Area in Boston, Massachusetts. The hospital is home to the world's largest pediatric research enterprise, and it is the leading recipient of pediatric research funding from the National Institutes of Health (NIH). It provides comprehensive pediatric specialties and subspecialties to infants, children, teens, and young adults aged 0–21 throughout Massachusetts, the United States, and the world. The hospital also sometimes treats adults that require pediatric care. The hospital uses the Brigham and Women's Hospital's rooftop helipad and is an ACS verified level I pediatric trauma center, one of three in Boston. The hospital features a regional pediatric intensive-care unit and an American Academy of Pediatrics verified level IV neonatal intensive care unit.

Boston Children's Hospital has been ranked as best pediatric medical center by U.S. News & World Report more times than any other hospital and is currently ranked as the best children's hospital in the United States. Its research enterprise is the world's largest and most highly funded pediatric hospital. In the 2022 fiscal year, it received more funding from the NIH than any other children's hospital in the nation. Boston Children's Hospital was ranked #1 in U.S. News & World Report's 2024–25 Best Children’s Hospitals Honor Roll, marking its tenth consecutive year in the #1 position. The hospital was also rated #1 in the 2025 "World's Best Specialized Hospitals" list for pediatrics by Newsweek.

== Overview ==
One of the largest pediatric medical centers in the United States, Children's offers a complete range of health care services for children from birth through 21 years of age. Its Advanced Fetal Care Center can begin interventions at 15 weeks gestation, and, in some situations (e.g., congenital heart disease and strabismus), Children's also treats adult patients. The institution is home to 40 clinical departments and 258 specialized clinical programs.

From 1 October 2017, through 30 September 2018 (fiscal year 2018), the hospital recorded:

- 622,000 outpatient visits
- 60,000 emergency department visits
- 28,000 inpatient and day surgical cases
- 5.4-day average length of stay
- a 2.13 average case-mix

The hospital's clinical staff includes approximately 2,000 active medical and dental staff, 475 residents, fellows, and interns, and over 2,700 nurses. In addition to clinical personnel, Boston Children's has the largest pediatric research enterprise with 3,000 researchers and scientific staff and more NIH funding than any other children's hospital. A trained team of more than 460 volunteers devote thousands of hours each year to support the hospital staff and patients. As of 2025, the hospital reported more than 750 affiliated physicians across Massachusetts, Connecticut, New Hampshire, New Jersey, and New York, 8 satellite and physician offices, 7 community hospitals and 1 community health center. Kevin B. Churchwell serves as the hospital's current CEO.

As of January 2024, the Boston Children's Hospital's Global Services team serves over 2,500 patients from more than 160 countries. Services provided including coordination of visits, medical records, travel, accommodation, and immigration. The hospital offers a global medical second opinion program in partnership with Grand Rounds, Inc. There are more than 3000 Harvard faculty affiliated with Boston Children’s Hospital.

In 2019, Boston Children's Hospital was ranked the top pediatric hospital by U.S. News & World Report for the sixth year in a row. Boston Children's was the first stand-alone pediatric hospital in New England to be awarded Magnet status by the American Nurses Credentialing Center.

Boston Children's Hospital is home to the United States' first pediatric and adolescent transgender health program.

== History ==
Children's was founded on 20 July 1869, by Francis Henry Brown, a Civil War surgeon, who traveled to Europe in 1867 to study the pioneering specialized approach to treating children. Brown was impressed with the treatments he witnessed and he wanted to bring that level of care to Boston. Brown opened a 20-bed facility in a small townhouse at 9 Rutland Street in Boston's South End.

Approximately one year after opening, the hospital was moved to the corner of Rutland and Washington Streets. Children's Hospital stayed at this location until 1871 when the hospital moved to Huntington Avenue before its final move to what would become the Longwood Medical and Academic Area.

In 1891 Thomas Morgan Rotch, Children's chief physician, established the nation's first laboratory for the modification and production of bacteria-free milk. Before the establishment of this laboratory, breast milk was often the carrier of many deadly diseases that children were especially susceptible to.

=== 1900s ===
Harvard Medical School affiliated itself with Boston Children's in 1903.

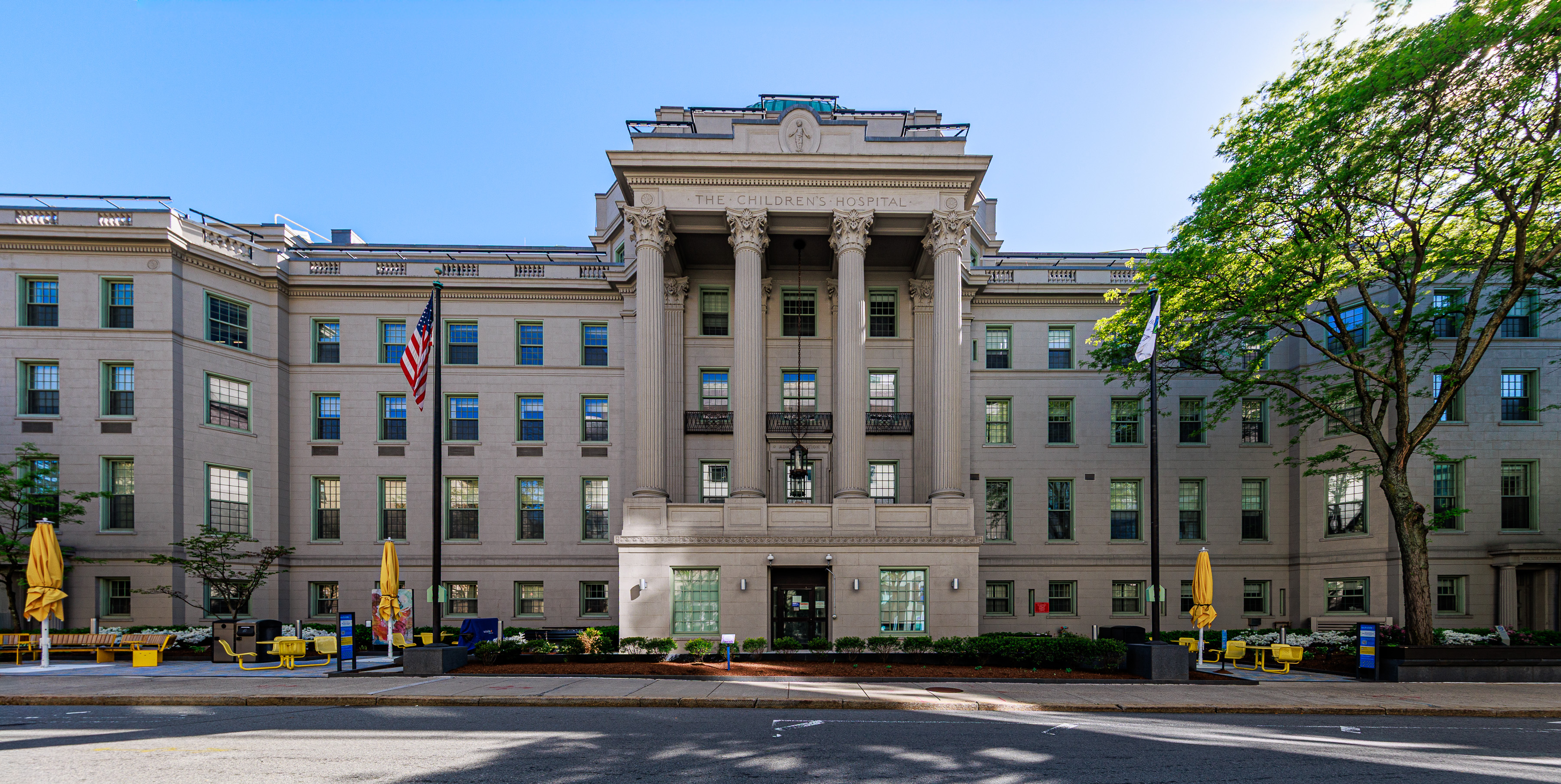
Hunnewell Building on Longwood Avenue. Architects: Shepley, Rutan and Coolidge, (1914)

Boston Children's Hospital moved to an area of more than 130,000 square feet on Longwood Avenue in 1914, where the Ebenezer Francis farm was located. The cost of the area was $120,000.

William Ladd, a doctor with Children's, devised procedures for correcting various congenital defects such as intestinal malformations in 1920, launching the specialty of pediatric surgery.

Robert E. Gross, a surgeon at Children's and later a professor of child surgery at Harvard Medical School, performed the world's first successful surgical procedure to correct a congenital heart defect with the "ligation of a patent ductus arteriosus" in 1938, ushering in the era of modern pediatric cardiac surgery.

Sidney Farber, pediatric pathologist, requested Yellapragada Subbarow (a friend and colleague from Harvard Medical School then working at Lederle Laboratories) to supply aminopterin and later amethopterin (methotrexate) to conduct trials on to children with leukemia, a diagnosis that was deemed a "death sentence," in 1948. He achieved the world's first partial remission of acute leukemia. He went on to co-found the Dana-Farber Cancer Institute in 1950.

John Enders, his assistant Thomas Weller, and colleague Frederick Robbins, successfully cultured the polio virus in 1949, making possible the development of the Salk and Sabin vaccines for polio. They won the Nobel Prize for their work in 1954. Enders and his team went on to culture the measles virus.

Judah Folkman published "Tumor angiogenesis: Therapeutic implications" in the 1971 November issue of the New England Journal of Medicine. It was the first paper to describe Folkman's theory that tumors recruit new blood vessels to grow.

The Boston Brace, a new, lower profile brace for patients with scoliosis was developed by Chief of Orthopedics John E. Hall and orthotist Bill Miller at the Boston Children's scoliosis clinic in 1972.

Boston Children's conducted a widespread study on donated teeth from children living in Chelsea and Somerville in the 1970s to study how lead effected children's behavior, development and IQ. The results showed that "children whose teeth had the highest lead levels were far behind those with the lowest on measures including IQ, motor coordination and attentiveness in class."

Hypoplastic left heart syndrome, a defect in which an infant is born without a functioning left ventricle was first treated via surgical palliation in 1983. The procedure was the first to palliate what had been a fatal condition. Three years later, in 1986, Children's surgeons performed the hospital's first heart transplant. Later in the year, a 15-month-old patient became the youngest person in New England to receive a heart transplant.

Boston Children's Chief of Hematology and Oncology David Nathan recommended for Claudia De Pass, a young patient with sickle cell disease, to try Hydroxyurea, a drug used to treat blood cancer, to treat her sickle cell disease. The treatment worked and Hydroxyurea is now broadly used to treat sickle cell disease.

Researchers in neurology and genetics discover the toxicity beta amyloid, a protein that accumulates in the brains of people with Alzheimer's disease, to neurons in 1989. This discovery indicates beta amyloid as the possible cause of the degenerative disease.

Endostatin, one of the most potent inhibitors of blood vessel growth, is discovered by Drs. Michael O'Reilly and Judah Folkman in 1997. In mice, endostatin has shown promise in slowing some cancers to a dormant state. Phase I clinical trials began at three centers in 1999.

Evan Snyder clones the first neural stem cells from the human central nervous system of a fetus in 1998, offering the possibility of cell replacement and gene therapies for patients with neurodegenerative disease, neural injury or paralysis.

In 1998, Children's establishes its Advanced Fetal Care Center to provide diagnostic services, genetic and obstetrical counseling, and prenatal or immediate postpartum intervention for fetuses with complex birth defects. The same year, Larry Benowitz, PhD grows nerve cells in the damaged spinal cords of rats, a significant step in the treatment of spinal cord injuries. The next year, Benowitz discovers that inosine is important in controlling axon regeneration in nerve cells.

=== 2000–present ===
In 2002, Scott Pomeroy and Todd Golub use microarray gene expression profiling to identify different types of brain tumors and predict clinical outcome. This allows radiation and chemotherapy to be tailored to kill cancer cells while leaving healthy tissue alone. Also in 2002, Nader Rifai helps to author a paper showing that cholesterol levels and LSD use are less accurate predictors of predisposition to strokes and heart attacks then presence of a C-reactive protein that can be found in blood test results.

Heung Bae Kim and Tom Jaksic develop, test and successfully perform the world's first serial transverse enteroplasty (STEP) procedure for patients with short bowel syndrome in 2003. The next year, Children's surgeons perform New England's first multi visceral organ transplant when 11-month-old Abdullah Alazemi receives a stomach, pancreas, liver, and small intestine from a single donor.

In 2005, in the best-documented effort to date, Drs. Felix Engel and Mark Keating get adult heart-muscle cells to divide and multiply in mammals, the first step in regenerating heart tissue. Also in 2005, neurosurgeon Benjamin Warf brought a technique back to Boston Children's for shuntlessly treating hydrocephalus, the condition of excess fluid around the brain.

In 2006, Dale Umetsu, Omid Akbari and colleagues reported that a newly recognized type of immune cell, NKT, may play an important role in causing asthma, even in the absence of conventional T-helper cells. In addition, NKT cells respond to a different class of antigens that are currently recognized to trigger asthma. In that same year, Larry Benowitz and colleagues discovered a naturally occurring growth factor called oncomodulin that stimulates regeneration in injured optic nerves, raising the possibility of treating blindness due to optic-nerve damage and the hope of achieving similar regeneration in the spinal cord and brain.

Norman Spack co-founds Boston Children's Hospital's Gender Management Service (GeMS) clinic in 2007; it is America's first clinic to treat transgender children and the first to prescribe puberty blockers. The clinic provides "counseling and resources in the years before medical intervention is appropriate, along with psychological support and a stepwise approach to medical treatment."

In collaboration with Life Technologies, Boston Children's spins out its genetic diagnostic lab in January 2013 to a new firm called Claritas Genomics. The goal of the partnership is to develop genetic and genomic tests for inherited pediatric diseases. Five years later, in January 2018, Claritas ceases operations. The hospital remains Claritas' majority shareholder during its existence, and a Series B funding round was completed in 2015, raising at least US$15 million.

In 2016, the hospital receives approval by the Massachusetts Public Health Council for a $1 billion expansion to the Longwood Medical and Academic Area. The hospital plans to build an 11-story building with 71 new beds, renovate part of the current campus, and build a new outpatient clinic in Brookline, Massachusetts.

== The Dana-Farber/Boston Children's Cancer and Blood Disorders Center ==
The Dana-Farber/Boston Children's Cancer and Blood Disorders Center is a hospital in Boston, Massachusetts, focused on treating children with cancer and blood disorders. It brings together the resources and expertise of Dana-Farber Cancer Institute and Boston Children's Hospital to offer advanced care and treatments. The center is recognized globally for its research and for developing new therapies to improve outcomes for young patients.

== Controversies ==
=== Justina Pelletier controversy ===
In 2013, Boston Children's Hospital became part of a dispute concerning the treatment of minor Justina Pelletier, which ultimately involved the Massachusetts Department of Children and Families. In February 2012, Pelletier was taken to the emergency-room at Boston Children's Hospital, a trip prompted by severe stomach pain and difficulty walking, For a variety of symptoms, Pelletier had previously been taken by her parents to see doctors across multiple states, receiving multiple diagnoses. She had most recently been diagnosed with mitochondrial disease while a patient at Tufts Medical Center. The BCH doctors doubted that difficult-to-confirm diagnosis, owing to the lack of abnormal blood markers and the fact that there had been no finding of an accumulation of mitochondria in the cell membranes of skeletal muscles, often called the "hallmark of mitochondrial disorders". (Mark Korson, Pelletier's Tufts doctor, had not performed a muscle biopsy.) Jurriaan Peters, a pediatric neurologist at BCH who evaluated Pelletier, suspected somatoform disorder—a psychological condition creating or worsening physical symptoms. Moreover, Peters suspected that Pelletier was a victim of factitious disorder by proxy—a form of medical abuse in which parents subject their children to excessive medical care. This suspicion was shared by some of Pelletier's prior doctors. In addition to conversations with Pelletier's past doctors, some of whom shared Peters's suspicion, Peters noted that Pelletier "had multiple diagnoses [and] a very patchy network of providers. Those are all classic red flags." However, one of Pelletier's former pediatricians, Thomas Binder, would later state that he never suspected any child abuse.

The Boston Children's Hospital team crafted a treatment plan, with input from some of Pelletier's doctors at Tufts, to "de-medicalize" the case and provide in-hospital psychological care. Although Pelletier's parents were initially receptive, Pelletier's father subsequently attempted to remove Pelletier from the hospital's care, and the team filed a 51A report—used to alert the Massachusetts Department of Children and Families of potential child abuse. Custody of Pelletier was transferred to that agency by order of Judge Joseph Johnston, and the DCF elected to keep her in treatment at Boston Children's Hospital. Pelletier was held in Boston Children's Hospital's psychiatric ward, Bader 5, from 14 February 2013, until January 2014, when she was transferred to Wayside Youth and Family Support Network, a residential treatment center in Framingham. Reports vary of Pelletier's condition during this stay: Pelletier's father said that Pelletier was "declining" in a way visible "to anyone," while the hospital records reflected Pelletier gaining strength, becoming less reliant on a feeding tube, and having regular bowel movements—something her parents had said was not possible without a tube forcing solution into her intestines to make her colon contract.

The case, covered extensively by the media, sparked public protests and a cyberattack campaign on the hospital by Martin Gottesfeld (who was subsequently criminally charged and convicted). In mid 2014, the DCF began allowing Pelletier's parents increasingly expanded visitation rights—including unsupervised day trips, and, on 6 June, the agency requested that Pelletier be returned to her parents. On 17 June 2014, Judge Johnston dismissed the child-protection case against the parents, holding that they had successfully demonstrated a "change in circumstances" and noting that they had been cooperative in Pelletier's treatment; the dismissal resulted in the return of Justina to her family. Since her return, Pelletier has undergone multiple medical procedures, including having her colon removed, and the family is currently exploring spinal-related explanations for why Pelletier continues to be unable to walk. The family filed a medical malpractice suit against the hospital, which, after years of litigation, was ultimately resolved in favor of the hospital, after a jury found that Pelletier's doctors had not been negligent.

=== Harassment campaign against gender-affirming care ===
In August 2022, right-wing Twitter account Libs of TikTok made approximately 13 tweets about the Boston Children's Hospital and their gender-affirming care, falsely claiming that they were providing "gender-affirming hysterectomies" to minors. One of these tweets contained a reposted video in which a Boston Children's Hospital gynecologist discusses a "gender affirming hysterectomy" procedure. The video was removed after the hospital started receiving large amounts of online criticism, despite the physician not suggesting that the procedure is offered to children. This misinformation was repeated by other prominent conservative social media influencers including David J Harris and Billboard Chris. These tweets resulted in the hospital, its employees, and providers receiving death threats, "hostile internet activity, phone calls, and harassing emails including threats of violence". On 30 August, the hospital received an anonymous bomb threat by phone which forced the hospital into a temporary lockdown, although it is unknown whether the threat was related to the harassment. A second bomb threat was received on 9 September, which police likewise responded to. On 15 September, the Federal Bureau of Investigation (FBI) announced that Catherine Leavy of Westfield, Massachusetts had been arrested in connection with the first bomb threat. She was charged with one count of making a false bomb threat through telephone and could face up to five years in prison. After the announcement of the arrest, Libs of TikTok tweeted: "This is great news. Threats of violence should always be taken seriously."

The Washington Post, USA Today, NPR, and Politifact rejected the tweets and claims as false. According to the hospital's website and statements, the hospital adheres to medical guidelines developed by the World Professional Association for Transgender Health and gender-affirming care involving genital surgeries are only offered to patients between the ages of 18 and 35 while surgical consultations can be offered beginning at the age of 17. The hospital said in another statement that "We condemn these attacks in the strongest possible terms, and we reject the false narrative upon which they are based". When contacted by The Washington Post, Raichik did not answer a question about whether she felt responsible for the threats made against the hospitals she tweeted about, including Boston Children's Hospital, but said that "we 100% condemn any acts/threats of violence".

According to The Washington Post, an archived version of the hospital's website appeared to state that vaginoplasties, the surgical construction or reconstruction of a vagina, were available to 17-year-olds at the hospital. The hospital has since updated its website to reflect its policy of gender-affirming surgeries only being offered to patients between the ages of 18 and 35. The hospital also clarified that patients can only receive surgical consultations at 17.

On 18 September 2022, several protesters opposed to transgender youth services and around 200 counter-protesters gathered outside Boston Children's Hospital on Longwood Avenue for several hours. Armed Boston police officers kept both groups separate.

In November 2022, a third bomb threat was called in, with the caller claiming the explosives were placed in the section of the hospital responsible for gender affirming care. A subsequence police sweep yielded no explosive devices.

==== Reactions ====
NBC News has described Libs of TikTok as "one of the primary drivers of the harassment campaign" against Boston Children's Hospital.

Legal authorities in the state put out statements supporting the hospital and its patients, with a spokesman for the Boston Police Department stating that they were investigating the threats. The United States Department of Justice (DOJ) also launched an investigation into the threats and has spoken out in support of the hospital, saying that they will "ensure equal protection of transgender people under the law".

FBI Boston Special Agent in Charge Joseph Bonavolonta said that "Making threats of violence is not a prank — It's a federal crime", and added, "These threats with innocent people at risk divert law enforcement from responding to actual emergencies are costly to taxpayers, and cause undue stress to victims and the community." The U.S. Attorney for Massachusetts Rachael Rollins called the attacks "disturbing", adding that "health care providers who support and offer care to gender-diverse and transgender individuals and their families deserve to do so without fear." Boston Mayor Michelle Wu condemned the threats being made against the hospital.

Harvard Law School clinical instructor and transgender rights activist Alejandra Caraballo said that "It's very disturbing to see people justify attacking a children's hospital because of their transphobia and their hatred of trans people". Michael Haller, a professor of pediatric endocrinology at the University of Florida, said that "A lot of people have chosen to try to be as quiet about their practice as they can to avoid those direct attacks" and that "Institutions have removed their websites, taken down their publicly facing phone numbers." Michelle Forcier, a clinician at LGBT telehealth group Folx Health, argued that "Kids are getting this significant messaging of, not only are you not okay, but we want to hurt you", adding "That's a pretty scary message to get as an 8-year-old or 12-year-old. It absolutely makes everybody think twice about walking in the door [to a hospital], kids and parents."

Fox News host Tucker Carlson accused Boston Children's Hospital of "playing the victim" after receiving a bomb threat.

== Adult programs ==
In addition to their pediatric specialties, Boston Children's Hospital serves adults through a couple of their nationally recognized programs. BCH completes adult research in addition to their pediatric research.

- BCH has one of the largest adult congenital heart disease (ACHD) programs in the U.S., providing congenital cardiac care to every age.
- Boston Children's Hospital also houses an adult strabismus service that offers comprehensive evaluation and treatment for adults.
- BCH also houses an adult cystic fibrosis program in collaboration with nearby Brigham & Women's Hospital.
- BCH houses the maternal fetal care center in collaboration with Brigham & Women's Hospital, providing care for mothers carrying babies with congenital anomalies.

== Research ==
The Boston Children's Hospital's research facility consists of more than 1,000,000 square feet (93,000 m^{2}) of laboratory space including 58,000 square-feet of clinical research space, making it the largest pediatric medical center in the world. As of 2018, the hospital's research staff included over 3,000 researchers and scientific staff. Boston Children's researchers have been honored as members of the National Academy of Sciences, Institute of Medicine, American Academy of Arts and Sciences, and Howard Hughes Medical Institute.

=== Laboratory facilities ===
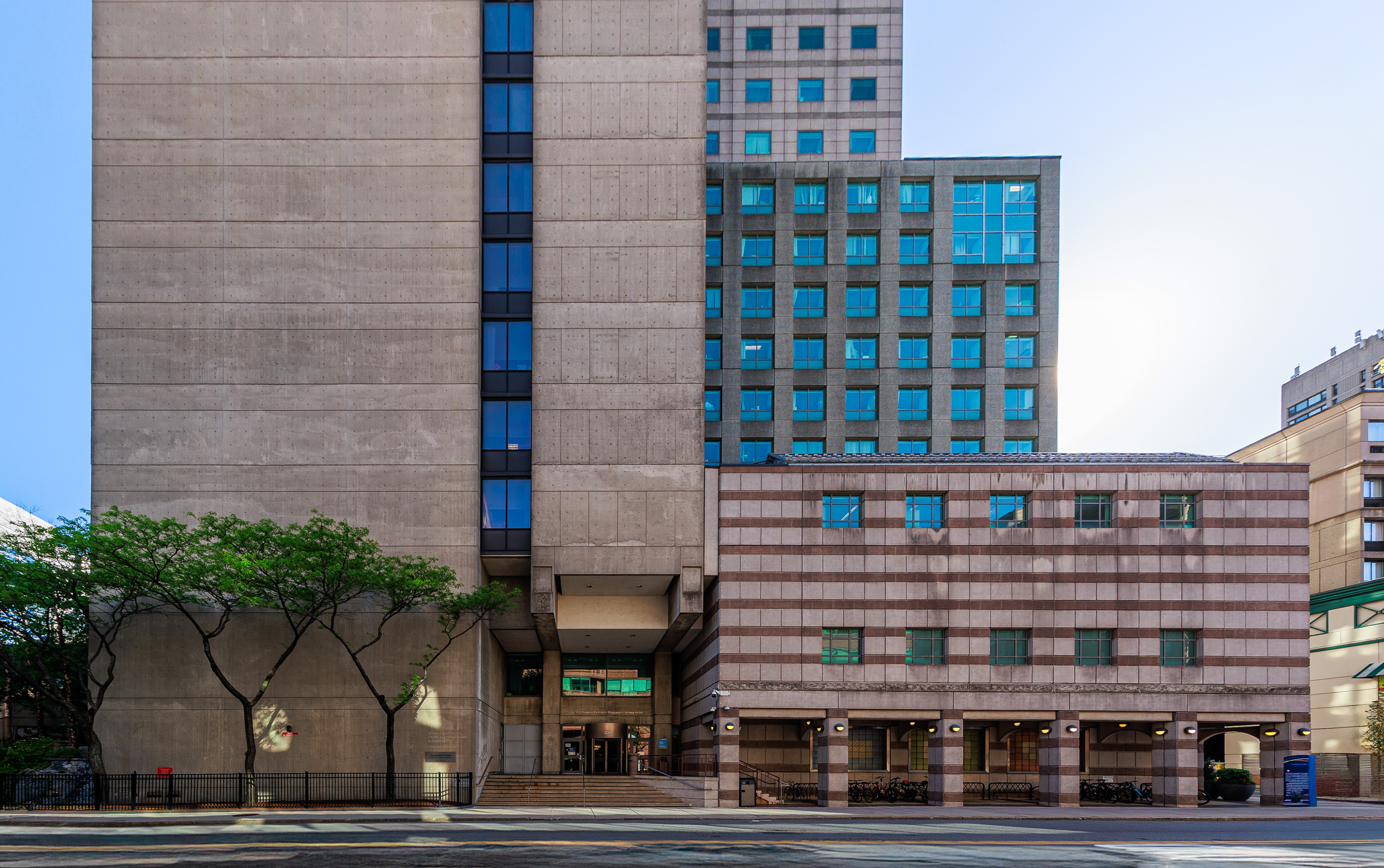
John F. Enders Pediatric Research Laboratories

John F. Enders Pediatric Research Laboratories
Named in honor of John Franklin Enders, the Boston Children's Hospital researcher and Nobel laureate who cultured poliovirus and the measles virus.
Karp Family Research Laboratories
This 295,000-square-foot (27,400 m^{2}) building opened in 2003 and increased the hospital's research space by over 60%.
Center for Life Science
Boston Children's Hospital researchers currently occupy more than 4 floors of this 700,000 square-foot, privately managed research facility.
Alexandria Center for Life Science – Fenway

Boston Children's Hospital has purchased a significant portion of a life science lab building under construction in Fenway, a Class A lab building within the larger Alexandria Center for Life Science-Fenway mega campus. The hospital will acquire 268,000 square feet for approximately $155 million. The building is expected to be completed in 2026. The space will serve as an "incubator of innovation," fostering collaboration among scientists. Alexandria will develop and manage the entire building, as well as the larger 2 million square foot life science campus. The project includes open spaces, connections to public transportation (MBTA Fenway station), bike paths, pedestrian walkways, Time Out Market food court, and retail on the ground floor. The Precision Vaccines Program of Boston Children's Hospital is located on the 13th floor of the 201 Brookline Ave in the Alexandria Center for Life Science-Fenway mega campus.

=== Informatics program ===
The Computational Health Informatics Program (CHIP) at Boston Children's Hospital was founded in 1994. The program's research includes several free and open-source software projects.

=== Stem cell program ===
Children's Stem Cell Program investigator George Q. Daley, M.D., Ph.D., has made dozens of iPS lines developed at Boston Children's Hospital available for use by other scientists through the Harvard Stem Cell Institute, an institution affiliated with Boston Children's Hospital.

In 2010, a drug that boosts numbers of blood stem cells, originally discovered in zebrafish in the Boston Children's Hospital laboratory of Leonard I. Zon, M.D., went to clinical trial in patients with leukemia and lymphoma.

=== Center on Media and Child Health ===
The Digital Wellness Lab, founded by Dr. Michael Rich, was launched in March 2021. It evolved from the Center on Media and Child Health (CMCH), which was a non-profit organization based at Boston Children's Hospital. CMCH was founded in 2002, by pediatrician Michael Rich, Associate Professor of Pediatrics at Harvard Medical School; and Associate Professor of Society, Human Development, and Health at Harvard T.H. Chan School of Public Health.

CMCH conducted scientific research to improve the understanding of media influence and provided evidence-based expertise to initiatives and programs that address children's involvement with media. CMCH researchers investigated correlations between media use and children's physical and mental health outcomes, measuring media exposure in youth. Combining techniques of momentary sampling and video capture, this method is more sensitive to the variety of media used, more responsive to media multitasking, and more accurate in its capture of both media content and usage time.

=== Precision Vaccines Program ===
The Precision Vaccines Program (PVP) is a multi-disciplinary academic program employing cutting edge technologies such as systems biology, human in vitro modelling and adjuvant science to advance discovery and development of vaccines tailored for vulnerable populations. Led by Ofer Levy, the Precision Vaccines Program focuses on improving vaccine safety and effectiveness of vaccines including those against infectious diseases and fentanyl overdose.

== Awards ==
=== Nobel Prizes ===
Children's Hospital scientist John Enders and his team were first to successfully culture the polio virus and were awarded the Nobel Prize in Physiology or Medicine in 1954.

Joseph Murray, chief plastic surgeon at Children's Hospital Boston from 1972 to 1985 was awarded the Nobel Prize in Physiology or Medicine in 1990 for his research on immunosuppression, specifically his "discoveries concerning organ and cell transplantation in the treatment of human disease".

=== Lasker Awards ===
William Lennox received the Lasker Award in 1951 for his work researching epilepsy. Lennox organized the American Epilepsy League and the Committee for Public Understanding of Epilepsy.

Robert Gross received the Lasker Award in 1954 for performing the first operation for patent ductus arteriosus, a congenital heart defect, in 1938. He received an additional Lasker in 1959 for being the first surgeon to graft artery tissue from one person to another in 1958.

John Enders was awarded the Lasker in 1954; the same year he was awarded the Nobel Prize for "achievement in the cultivation of the viruses poliomyelitis, mumps, and measles".

Sidney Farber received the Lasker in 1966 for his 1947 discovery that a combination of aminopterin and methotrexate, both folic acid antagonists, could produce remission in patients with acute leukemia, and for "his constant leadership in the search for chemical agents against cancer".

Porter W. Anderson, Jr. received the Albert Lasker Clinical Medical Research Award with David H. Smith in 1996 for groundbreaking work in the development and commercialization of the Hemophilus influenza type B vaccine.

=== Breakthrough Prize in Life Sciences ===
Dr. Stuart Orkin, an investigator at Boston Children’s Hospital and Professor at Harvard Medical School, was awarded the 2026 Breakthrough Prize in Life Sciences for his discovery of the BCL11A gene as the master repressor of fetal hemoglobin after birth.

=== U.S. News & World Report ===
In 2016, it was ranked as the best children's hospital in America by U.S. News & World Report and was ranked #1 in cancer, #1 in cardiology, #2 in endocrinology, #1 in gastroenterology and GI surgery, #1 in neonatology, #1 in nephrology, #1 in neurology and neurosurgery, #1 in orthopedics, #2 in pulmonology, and #1 in urology.

In 2021 the hospital was ranked #1 best children's hospital in the United States by U.S. News & World Report on the publications' honor roll list.

As of 2021 Boston Children's has placed nationally in all 10 ranked pediatric specialties on U.S. News & World Report.

2021 U.S. News & World Report rankings for Boston Children's
| Specialty | Rank (In the U.S.) | Score (Out of 100) |
|---|---|---|
| Neonatology | #6 | 92.1 |
| Pediatric Cancer | #2 | 99.3 |
| Pediatric Cardiology & Heart Surgery | #4 | 89.9 |
| Pediatric Diabetes & Endocrinology | #2 | 94.7 |
| Pediatric Gastroenterology & GI Surgery | #2 | 99.7 |
| Pediatric Nephrology | #1 | 100.0 |
| Pediatric Neurology & Neurosurgery | #1 | 100.0 |
| Pediatric Orthopedics | #2 | 97.8 |
| Pediatric Pulmonology & Lung Surgery | #1 | 100.0 |
| Pediatric Urology | #1 | 100.0 |
