= Hagar Rublev =

Israeli peace activist

- הגר רובלב
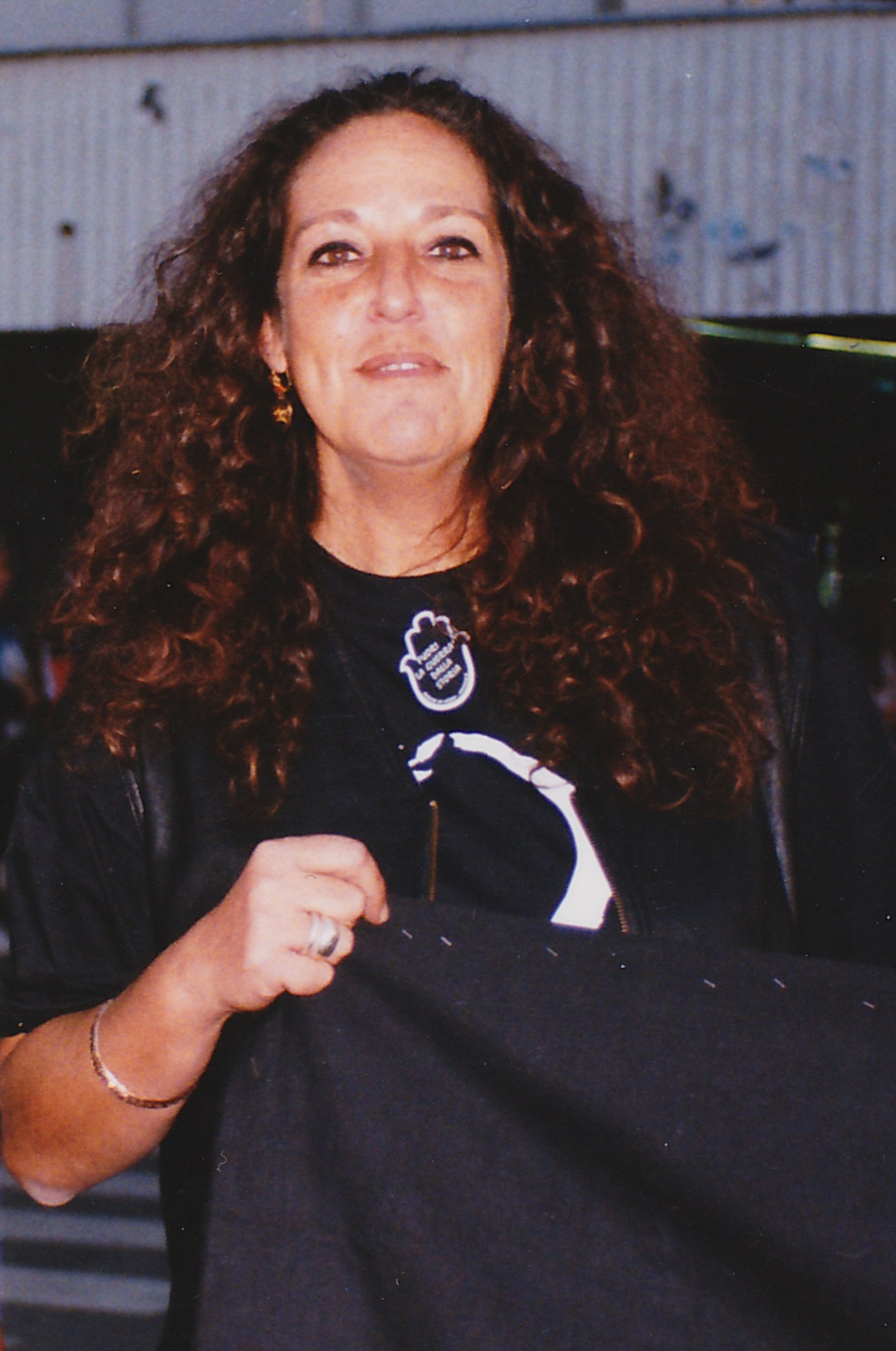
- Rublev in 1999
- Born: 9 January 1954; Israel
- Died: 22 August 2000 (aged 46); Paros, Greece
- Other name: Hagar Roublev
- Occupation: Peace activist

Hagar Rublev (Hebrew: הגר רובלב; 9 January 1954 – 22 August 2000) was an Israeli peace activist and lesbian feminist. In January 1988, she was an inspiring co-founder of the pacifist movement Women in Black which was created to protest violations of human rights by Israeli soldiers in the new Palestinian territories, occupied since 1967. Rublev later helped to create Bat Shalom, a feminist peace movement designed to resolve the conflict by ensuring coordination between Israeli and Palestinian women. She was also an active supporter of the rights of lesbians.

== Biography ==
Born in Israel on 9 January 1954, Hagar Rublev took an early interest in the fate of the Palestinians who lived in territories occupied by the Israelis. From 1984 to 1987, she worked for the Palestine Liberation Organization in Paris. She believed increasingly that women should begin to demonstrate against the Intifada. On 9 January 1988, she was one of eight women dressed in black who demonstrated in Paris Square, West Jerusalem against the Israeli occupation of Palestinian territory. Their banners in English, Hebrew and Arabic carried messages such as "Stop the occupation" and "Disband the Jewish settlements in Palestine". Rublev favoured a secular binational state for both the Israelis and Palestinians. The movement grew very quickly, both in Israel and internationally. Thanks to the participation of the Italian peace activist Luisa Morgantini, Women in Black demonistrations spread to Rome, then to Belgrade. By late 1990, encouraged by the Gulf War, the movement had reached Germany, India, Australia and the United States.

A few years later, Rublev extended her peace efforts by founding Bat Shalom (Daughters of Peace), fostering collaboration on true peace between Israeli and Palestinian women. Rublev was a strong supporter of lesbians. Many of those associated with Women in Black and her other peace initiatives were lesbians. They proved to be very effective in promoting her ideas.

== Death ==
On 22 August 2000, Hagar Rublev died unexpectedly from a heart attack while on holiday on the Greek island of Paros with her father Michel Rublev and friends, including Luisa Morgantin.

== See also ==
- List of peace activists
