= Erella Shadmi =

Israeli activist and sociologist

- אראלה שדמי
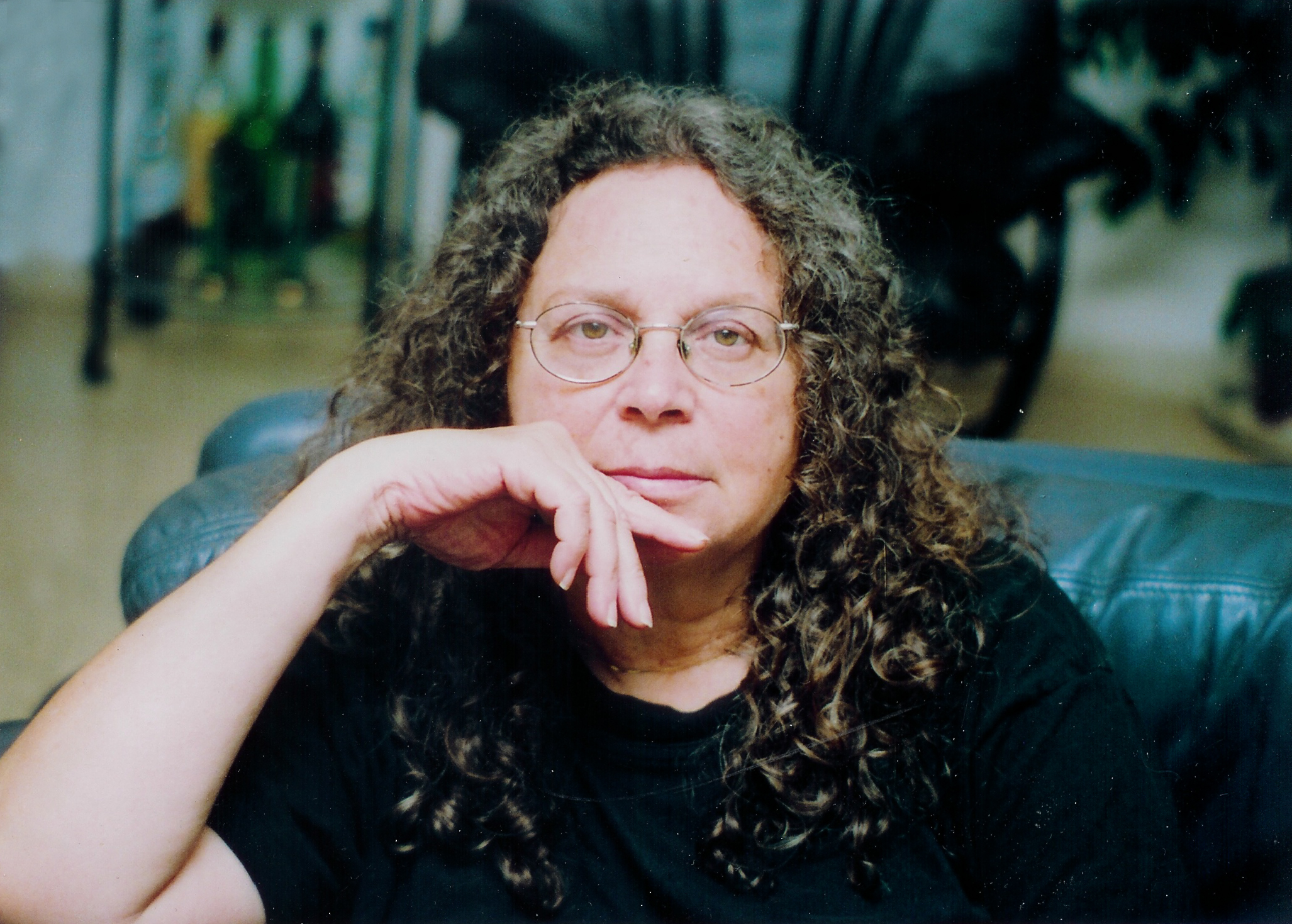
- Born: Tel Aviv
- Known for: Israeli sociologist

Erella Shadmi (Hebrew: אראלה שדמי) is an Israeli sociologist and peace activist. She previously worked for two decades for the Israel Police.

== Career ==
Shadmi was born in Tel Aviv. Whilst at school she attended left-wing demonstrations and became a peace activist. She then studied communications at university. Despite her activism giving her a critical attitude towards the Israel Police, she decided to join in 1970 and rose to the position of colonel. In an interview with Al-Monitor, she criticised the sexual inequalities she experienced and credited two commissioners (Herzl Shafir and Shaul Rosolio) for their respect of women. She also commented in a book chapter that the police force could tolerate her pregnancy but not her lesbianism. In 1996, she co-edited a history of the police force.

After two decades in the police, Shadmi left and became a sociologist heading the Women and Gender Studies department at Beit Berl College. She co-edited books on Israeli lesbianism and Women in Black. She studied how Israel's Zionist and patriarchal society does not tolerate lesbians. She also resumed her peace activism, joining Women in Black and Ahoti – for Women in Israel. In 2012, Shadmi published Fortified land: Police and policing in Israel, which documents how the police contributes to the formation of Israeli nationhood by enforcing hegemony and targeting minority groups such as anarchists, left-wing demonstrators, poor people and Russians.

== Selected works ==
- Shadmi, Erella (2012). Fortified land: Police and policing in Israel.
- Shadmi, Erella (1993). "Female police officers in Israel: Patterns of integration and discrimination". Feminist Issues. 13 (2): 23–45. doi:10.1007/BF02685733. S2CID 144492192.
