= Children of Peace =

- Founded: 2003/4
- Type: Charity
- Purpose: Arts, education, health and sports programmes
- Location: Uckfield, East Sussex, United Kingdom
- Region served: Gaza, Israel, Jordan, Lebanon, West Bank
- Website: http://www.childrenofpeace.org.uk http://childrenofpeace.world/Charity/gaza

Children of Peace is a British-based, non-partisan charity that focuses upon building friendship, trust and reconciliation between Israeli and Palestinian children, aged 4–17, regardless of community, faith, gender or heritage, through arts, education, healthcare and sports projects and programmes in the region, so that future generations and their communities might live in peace, side-by-side. The focus is on helping the children and building a better environment for the next generation.

Children of Peace has become a significant humanitarian, conflict-resolution NGO in the Middle East and a leading champion of children's rights in the region having helped over 125,000 children since 2004.

== Organization ==
Children of Peace is based in Uckfield, East Sussex, United Kingdom, and is structured around a Management Committee of Trustees, advisors and various sub-committees, including a Compliance Team, a Grants Committee and a Media Committee. The charity is currently developing plans for an advisory Development Board to the Trustees.

The charity works with a network of community-based organisations and non-governmental organisations in Bahrain, Egypt, Gaza, Israel, Jordan, Lebanon, Morocco, Turkey and the West Bank, who sign up to the notions of peaceful co-existence and cooperation. This is known as the Coalition of Peace and is now the single largest peace alliance across the MENA. The charity acts as a catalyst for interaction and interchange, funding projects that adhere to notions of conflict resolution, child protection and a refusal to take sides. Affiliates receive a quarterly online newsletter, Peace Child, which acts as a platform for contact and exchange.

=== Supporters ===
The charity is supported by a team of Goodwill Ambassadors, who act as advocates for Children of Peace and include Gaza writer Dalia al-Najjar, Palestinian peace leader Bassam Aramin, Palestinian writer Shireen Anabtawi, Israeli writer Daniela Norris, Israeli business leader Doron B Levinson, Israeli star Yasmin Levy, Mansoor Ijaz and Valerie Ijaz, Sally Becker (the 'Angel of Mostar') and Members of Parliament from main UK parliamentary parties – Louise Ellman (Labour) and Tobias Ellwood (Conservative).

Friends, drawn from public life, include Dame Helen Mirren, Mohammed Amin, Sir Michael Morpurgo, Matt Lucas, David Baddiel, Philip Glenister, Samantha Morton, Sir Patrick Stewart, Sheikh Ghassam Manasrah, Mira Awad, Sir Karl Jenkins, Yotam Ottolenghi, Zoe Heller, Elsa Zylberstein, Sophie Milman, Julia Sawalha, Toby Stephens, Emily Watson, Mark Ronson, Jeff Goldblum, Zubin Mehta, Maen Areikat, the Palestinian Ambassador to Washington, Manuel Hassassian, the Palestinian Envoy to the UK, Ofer Levy and Fiyaz Mughal.

The Patrons of Children of Peace are Madonna, Dame Judi Dench and John Sentamu, Archbishop of York. The Royal Patron is HH Princess Gabriele zu Leiningen, the former Begum Aga Khan.

Children of Peace has had the personal support of many world leaders, including Pope Francis, former US President Joe Biden, former Canadian Prime Minister Justin Trudeau, former UK Prime Ministers Tony Blair, Gordon Brown, David Cameron and Theresa May, former British Deputy Prime Minister Nick Clegg, former French Presidents Nicolas Sarkozy and François Hollande, and former French Prime Minister Manuel Valls.

== History ==
The charity was founded in 2003/4 by its president, Richard Martin, and formally launched in London in 2005, with the aim of protecting all of the children in the region – be they secular, Christian, Jewish or Muslim – from the arbitrary consequences of conflict.

In 2010 a cross-party EDM was approved by the UK Parliament in support of Children of Peace. During the opening ceremony of the London 2012 Olympics, the charity was honoured internationally when Sally Becker, Goodwill Ambassador to Children of Peace, carried the Olympic Flag into the stadium with other humanitarians, including Muhammad Ali and Ban Ki-moon.

In 2012 the charity brought over to the UK an Israeli-Palestinian girls’ peace choir – the Shani Choir - that opened the prestigious international Three Choirs Festival in Hereford, UK. The choir appeared live on BBC Breakfast and sang their signature song Imagine by John Lennon in Arabic, English and Hebrew.

In 2015 the charity received a personal blessing from Pope Francis. In 2017, the British National Theatre honoured Children of Peace with a special gala performance at the Harold Pinter Theatre in London of the hit Broadway play Oslo.
