= Norman Spack =

American endocrinologist

Norman P. Spack is an American pediatric endocrinologist at Boston Children's Hospital, where he co-founded the hospital's Gender Management Service (GeMS) clinic in February 2007. It was America's second clinic to treat transgender children, modeled after a similar Dutch system. He is an internationally known specialist in treatment for intersex and transgender youth, and is one of the first doctors in the United States to advocate prescribing hormone replacement therapy to minors. Spack, who is Jewish, has been an advocate for transgender resources and support groups for the Jewish community.

Spack has been consulted to discuss trans medical issues, often specifically pediatric, in media outlets such as 20/20, Time, The Atlantic, National Public Radio., and TEDTalk. He wrote the foreword of the 2008 book The Transgender Child: A Handbook for Families and Professionals.

== Early life and education ==
Spack earned his undergraduate degree at Williams College and graduated from Rochester School of Medicine in 1969.

== Work with transgender children ==
In 1985, Spack began working with transgender patients professionally. He argues that instead of being a mental disorder, transgenderism is a medical condition, and has been quoted as saying that "looking at transgenderism from a medical perspective will change the public perception that it is a psychological problem". Spack is also the senior associate in the endocrine division at Boston Children's Hospital. He helped co-found a treatment plan at the clinic called Gender Services Program (GeMS) that aims to slow puberty down for children questioning their gender. According to Spack, "the primary goal of the GeMS clinic is to provide medical treatment to appropriately screen gender-dysphoric adolescents, along with the comprehensive psychological evaluation recommended by the Adolescent Gender Identity Research Group (AGIR) and the Endocrine Society for making this clinical decision. The clinic does not currently provide ongoing mental health services to patients and families, but assists families in finding appropriate mental health therapists in their communities. The current clinic director is Dr. Jeremi Carswell.
