= Oncomodulin 2 =

Protein-coding gene in the species Homo sapiens

OCM2
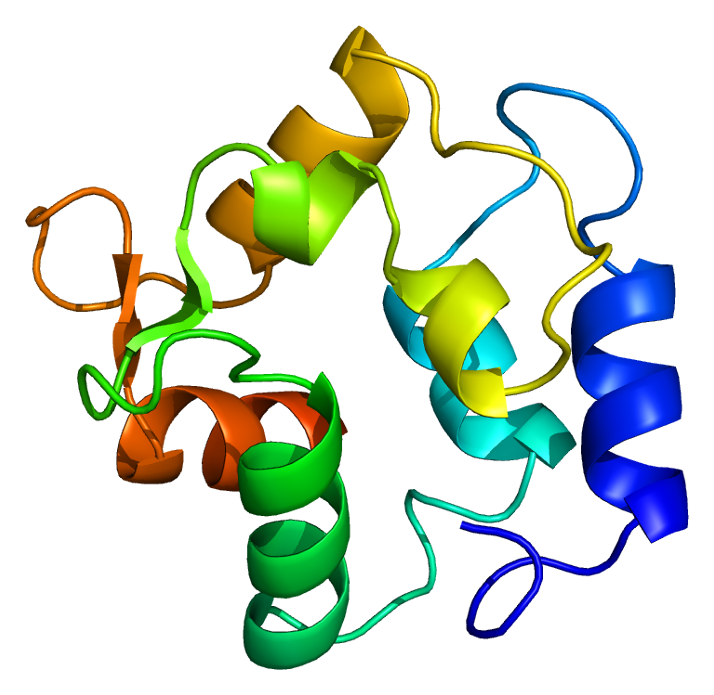

Identifiers
- Aliases: OCM2, OCM, LOC4951, oncomodulin 2, OM
- External IDs: MGI: 97401; GeneCards: OCM2

Gene location (Human)
Chr.	Chromosome 7 (human)
Band	7q21.3	Start	97,984,684 bp
Band	7q21.3	End	97,991,169 bp

Gene location (Mouse)
Chr.	Chromosome 5 (mouse)
Band	5 G2|5 82.85 cM	Start	143,956,622 bp
Band	5 G2|5 82.85 cM	End	143,963,488 bp
RNA expression pattern
Bgee	Human / Mouse (ortholog); Top expressed in: testicle; gonad; bone marrow; prefrontal cortex; placenta; primary visual cortex; lymph node; cell; blood; monocyte / Top expressed in: ileum; jejunum; cochlea; epithelium of small intestine; intestinal villus; Ileal epithelium; morula; blastocyst; secondary oocyte; primary oocyte; More reference expression data
BioGPS	n/a
Gene ontology
Molecular function	metal ion binding; calcium ion binding
Cellular component	nucleus; cytoplasm
Biological process	regulation of cytosolic calcium ion concentration
Sources:Amigo / QuickGO
Orthologs
Databases	NCBI: entry; OMA: entry
Species	Human	Mouse
Entrez	4951	18261
Ensembl	ENSG00000135175	ENSMUSG00000029618
UniProt	P0CE71	P51879
RefSeq (mRNA)	NM_006188	NM_033039
RefSeq (protein)	NP_006179	NP_149028
Location (UCSC)	Chr 7: 97.98 – 97.99 Mb	Chr 5: 143.96 – 143.96 Mb
PubMed search
- Wikidata
View/Edit Human	View/Edit Mouse

Oncomodulin 2, also known as OCM2, is a human gene that is similar to oncomodulin.

Oncomodulin is a high-affinity calcium ion-binding protein. It belongs to the superfamily of calmodulin proteins, also known as the EF-hand proteins. Oncomodulin 2 is an oncodevelopmental protein found in early embryonic cells in the placenta and also in tumors.
