= Mount Zion Award =

The Mount Zion Award is a biennial award by the Mount Zion Foundation, which has its seat at the Institute for Jewish-Christian Research (IJCF) at the University of Lucerne in Switzerland. The award is presented every other year close to October 28th. In 1986 the Mount Zion Foundation was created by the German Reverend Wilhelm Salberg (1925–1996), son of a Jewish father and a Christian mother. The Mount Zion Award is presented to persons of Jewish, Muslim or Christian faith, who have significantly contributed to the Jewish-Christian dialogue or to the understanding of the three Abrahamic religions, Judaism, Christianity and Islam, in Israel.

The presidents of the foundation, Prof. Dr. Verena Lenzen, director of the Institute for Jewish-Christian Research at the University of Lucerne, and the abbot of the Dormition Abbey in Jerusalem, Bernhard Maria Alter OSB, present the Mount Zion Award at the end of October or at the beginning of November, in remembrance of the Declaration on the Relation of the Catholic Church with Non-Christian Religions Nostra aetate of October 28, 1965.

== Laureates ==
- 1987: Dr. Mahmoud Abassi, Al-Masreq Publishing House, Shefar´am / Israel; Rose-Therese Sant, Sister of Zion, Jerusalem
- 1989: David Grossman, author, Mevasseret Zion / Israel
- 1991: Elisheva Hemker, Pastoral Officer, Haifa + Nahariya / Israel
- 1993: Dr. Kirsten Stoffregen-Pedersen ("Sister Abraham"), Jerusalem
- 1995: Elias und Heyam Jabbour, social worker, Shefar`Am / Israel; Yeheskel and Dalia Landau, social worker, Ramle + Jerusalem
- 1997: Sumaya Farhat Naser, lecturer at the University of Bir Zeit; Yitzhak Frankenthal, director of Neviot Shalom, Jerusalem
- 1999: Shmuel Toledano, politician, Jerusalem; Ass`ad Araidy, Druze, mayor of Maghar in Galilee
- 2001: Kifaya Jadah; Reuven Moskovitz; Emil Shoufany
- 2003: "Breaking Barriers", Jerusalem/Tel Aviv
- 2005: Rabbi Dr. David Rosen
- 2007: Sr. Monika Düllmann, Hôpital Saint-Louis de Jérusalem
- 2009: Dr. Nedal Jayousi, Palestinian House for Professional Solutions, Ramallah; Daniel Rossing, Jerusalem Center for Jewish-Christian Relations
- 2011: Friends of the Earth Middle East; Gidon Bromberg (Israeli Director), Munqeth Mehyar (Jordanian Director), Nader Al-Khateeb (Palestinian Director)
- 2013: Mrs. Yisca Harani, lecturer, researcher and inter-religious activist. And, Mrs. Margratte Karam.
- 2015: Fr. Dr. David Neuhaus, Patriarchal Vicar for Hebrew speaking Catholics, Coordinator of the Pastoral care of migrants.
- 2017: Amos Oz, writer, intellectual, professor of literature at Ben-Gurion University in Beersheba
- 2019: Gadi Gvaryahu from Tag Meir organization and Michael Krupp.
- 2022: Israel Yuval and Yehuda Bacon.

== See also ==
- List of religion-related awards
