= Sally Becker =

British humanitarian aid worker (born 1962)

- Born: 29 March 1962 (age 64); London, United Kingdom
- Occupation: Humanitarian
- Website: http://www.sallybecker.uk/

Sally Becker (born 29 March 1962) is a British humanitarian aid worker, best known for her work during the Bosnian and Kosovo Wars in the late 1990s. She is the founder of charities Road to Peace and Save a Child. She is credited with saving hundreds of lives through her actions in the Balkans, and was frequently referred to in the British media as the "Angel of Mostar".

== Activism ==
=== Bosnia and Herzegovina ===
Moved by the images of suffering in Bosnia and Herzegovina, Becker travelled there to deliver aid to people living close to the front line in west Mostar, driving into and out of the city in an old Renault. As one of the only foreign aid workers able to travel freely in the area, she was asked by a UN officer to try to gain access to the east side of the city, where 50,000 Bosniaks were trapped. With permission from the Croatian Ministry of Defence, she crossed the front line to evacuate wounded children and their families from the besieged hospital. The mission was successful and she became known as the Angel of Mostar.

On 10 December 1993, she led a convoy of 57 ambulances and trucks from the United Kingdom to deliver medical aid to besieged hospitals and evacuate wounded children and their families from on all sides of the conflict. She managed to arrange ceasefires, and is credited with saving hundreds of lives. The mission was dubbed Operation Angel.

In February 1994, aid convoys were grounded due to snow, leaving 28 injured children and their families trapped in a monastery serving as a makeshift hospital in Nova Bila. Becker reached the area by helicopter and flew them to safety.

=== Kosovo ===
When Slobodan Milošević ordered his troops into Kosovo as part of the Kosovo War, Becker led a humanitarian aid convoy to the region. When the borders were closed, she brought the convoys to northern Albania where thousands of refugees had escaped from the fighting. Led by a soldier from the Kosovo Liberation Army, she crossed the mountains into Kosovo on foot to bring pediatric medicines to a besieged hospital in Junik. She was asked to take 25 injured children and their mothers across the mountains to safety. They were ambushed by Serb paramilitaries and Becker, who stayed behind to help a woman and two children who were trapped, was captured and imprisoned. The families made it across the border and, when Becker was eventually released, she traced them to a refugee camp in northern Albania.

She arranged for them to travel to the United Kingdom for medical treatment but on 13 November 1998, the day the Hellenic Air Force was supposed to fly them to Britain, Home Office Minister Jack Straw refused to issue their visas. Two days later, Becker was shot by a masked gunman as she returned to her hotel with a colleague. The President of Albania sent his Minister of Health to evacuate her but she refused to leave without the children, remaining in the area until they were accepted for treatment in other countries.

=== Other countries ===
In August 2006, she brought humanitarian aid to families trapped in shelters during the conflict between Israel and Lebanon. Becker was appointed as a goodwill ambassador for Children of Peace, a multi-faith charity dedicated to building friendship, trust and reconciliation between Israeli and Palestinian children.

In 2016, Becker founded Road to Peace, a British charity helping children in areas of conflict. In 2016 she attempted to negotiate temporary asylum in the United Kingdom for 1400 Yazidi survivors. In 2018 she and her volunteers provided medical treatment for children fleeing from ISIL in Syria and northern Iraq and established an emergency medical facility for Yazidi children in Sinjar. From Mostar to Mosul and across the Middle East, Sally and her volunteers have helped thousands of sick and injured children.

Becker is the founder and Executive Director of Save A Child Global Paediatric Network, a registered British charity helping to save the lives of sick and injured children in besieged or remote areas across the globe.

== Awards and honours ==
- 1994 - Unsung Heroes - The Celebrity Guild of Great Britain.
- 1994 - The Ross McWhirter Award for Bravery
- 1994 - Women of the Year Great Britain
- 1995 - Special Award from The Variety Club of Great Britain
- 1999 - Woman of the Year - Blue Drop Group Sicily
- 2001 - Sally was granted the 'Freedom of Tropoje'
- 2012 - Sally was an Olympic flag bearer representing Peace and Justice at the 2012 Summer Olympics in London alongside United Nations Secretary-General Ban Ki-moon and boxer Muhammad Ali.
- 2020 - Sally was nominated for a Nobel Peace Prize by a group of academics from Slovenia for her work in the Balkans and other war torn areas.

== Books ==
- Becker's memoir, Sunflowers and Snipers, was published by The History Press in 2012.
- And Where Angels Fear to Tread: The Memoir of a Humanitarian Aid Worker was published by HarperCollins in April 2025.
