= Ofer Levy =

American immunologist and pediatrician

Personal details
- Born: New York City, United States
- Spouse: Sharon Levy
- Scientific career
- Education: Yale University (BS); New York University (MD, PhD); Boston Children's Hospital, Harvard Medical School (Pediatric residency and fellowship)
- Known for: Precision vaccinology; Host–pathogen interactions in early life; Age-specific vaccines; Novel adjuvants
- Fields: Immunology; Pediatrics; Vaccinology; Infectious diseases
- Workplaces: Harvard Medical School; Boston Children's Hospital; Precision Vaccines Program; Broad Institute
- Doctoral advisor: Peter Elsbach &; Jerrold Weiss

Ofer Levy is an American physician-scientist and pediatrician. He is Professor of Pediatrics at Harvard Medical School and Director of the Precision Vaccines Program at Boston Children's Hospital. His research focuses on precision vaccinology, an approach that seeks to develop age-specific vaccine components rather than a one-size-fits-all immunization strategy. He served as a voting member of the Food and Drug Administration's Vaccines and Related Biological Products Advisory Committee (VRBPAC).

== Early life and education ==
Levy grew up in New York City. He is the son of artist Benjamin Levy and music composer Hannah Levy. He attended the Bronx High School of Science in New York City. Levy graduated from Yale University with a Bachelor of Science degree in Molecular Biophysics and Biochemistry. He subsequently received his MD and PhD degrees from New York University. His doctoral research focused on antimicrobial proteins and peptides produced by neutrophils, under the supervision of Prof. Peter Elsbach and Prof. Jerrold Weiss. He completed his pediatric residency and fellowship in pediatric infectious diseases at Boston Children's Hospital and Harvard Medical School.

== Career and research ==
Levy is a Professor of Pediatrics at Harvard Medical School, Harvard Universityand a senior physician in the Division of Infectious Diseases at Boston Children's Hospital. He is also an associate member of the Broad Institute of MIT and Harvard. He is Director of the Precision Vaccines Program (PVP) at Boston Children's Hospital. Dr. Ofer Levy's research primarily focuses on precision vaccinology, particularly the development of vaccines and therapeutics that account for age-related differences in immune responses. His work addresses the needs of populations with distinct immunological characteristics, including newborns, infants, older adults, and immunocompromised individuals. His research applies precision medicine approaches to vaccine development, with an emphasis on understanding and addressing variations in vaccine responses across different populations.
