= Oncomodulin =

Protein found in humans

OCM

Identifiers
- Aliases: OCM, OCM1, OM, ONCM, oncomodulin
- External IDs: OMIM: 164795; MGI: 97401; GeneCards: OCM
Available structures
PDB	Ortholog search: PDBe RCSB
PDB	List of PDB id codes 1TTX

Gene location (Human)
Chr.	Chromosome 7 (human)
Band	7p22.1	Start	5,879,827 bp
Band	7p22.1	End	5,886,363 bp

Gene location (Mouse)
Chr.	Chromosome 5 (mouse)
Band	5 G2|5 82.85 cM	Start	143,956,622 bp
Band	5 G2|5 82.85 cM	End	143,963,488 bp
RNA expression pattern
Bgee	Human / Mouse (ortholog); Top expressed in: testicle; amygdala; granulocyte; cerebellar cortex; cerebellar hemisphere; blood; right hemisphere of cerebellum; lymph node; hypothalamus; Brodmann area 9 / Top expressed in: ileum; jejunum; cochlea; epithelium of small intestine; intestinal villus; Ileal epithelium; morula; blastocyst; secondary oocyte; primary oocyte; More reference expression data
BioGPS	n/a
Gene ontology
Molecular function	metal ion binding; calcium ion binding
Cellular component	nucleus; cytoplasm
Biological process	regulation of cytosolic calcium ion concentration
Sources:Amigo / QuickGO
Orthologs
Databases	NCBI: entry; OMA: entry
Species	Human	Mouse
Entrez	654231	18261
Ensembl	ENSG00000122543	ENSMUSG00000029618
UniProt	P0CE72	P51879
RefSeq (mRNA)	NM_001097622; NM_001391990; NM_001391991	NM_033039
RefSeq (protein)	NP_001091091	NP_149028
Location (UCSC)	Chr 7: 5.88 – 5.89 Mb	Chr 5: 143.96 – 143.96 Mb
PubMed search
- Wikidata
View/Edit Human	View/Edit Mouse

Oncomodulin (also called oncomodulin 1) is a calcium-binding protein of the parvalbumin family that in humans is encoded by the OCM gene. It is involved in calcium regulation in cochlear hair cells and has been implicated in promoting axon regeneration in retinal ganglion cells following optic nerve injury.

== Gene ==
Oncomodulins, also known as beta-1 parvalbumins, constitute an evolutionarily ancient group of parvalbumin-family proteins. Their genes are conserved across diverse vertebrate lineages, including cartilaginous fish, bony fish, and mammals.

In rats, the gene that encodes oncomodulin is under control of a solo oncomodulin LTR that comes from an endogenous intracisternal A-particle. The oncomodulin LTR is only present in rats. Oncomodulin levels are highest in the rat out of all other species that have been previously investigated.

== Expression ==
Oncomodulin has been detected in cytotrophoblasts of human and rat placentas, early embryos, and various human and rodent tumors. It is also expressed in inner ear hair cells and by inflammatory cells, including macrophages, which can release the protein following tissue injury.

== Structure ==
Oncomodulin is a small, acidic protein of 108 amino acid residues and approximately 12 kDa that belongs to the parvalbumin family of EF-hand calcium-binding proteins. Its structure closely resembles that of alpha-parvalbumin, with approximately 50–54% amino acid sequence identity.

The protein contains an N-terminal region with a nonfunctional calcium-binding site and two functional EF-hand motifs: one that binds both Ca^{2+} and Mg^{2+} with relatively low affinity and another with high affinity for Ca^{2+}. Crystallographic studies have characterized the coordination of bound calcium ions by oxygen atoms from protein ligands and water molecules, with Ca–O distances ranging from 2.07 to 2.64 Å.

== Function ==
=== Auditory ===
Oncomodulin contributes to calcium regulation and the maintenance of normal function in mouse cochlear hair cells.

=== Axon regeneration ===
Oncomodulin is released by inflammatory cells, including macrophages, and has been implicated in promoting axon regeneration following optic nerve injury. In experimental studies, oncomodulin has promoted regeneration of retinal ganglion cell axons in rats. It has been reported to stimulate neurite outgrowth more effectively than several other neurotrophic factors, including brain-derived neurotrophic factor (BDNF), ciliary neurotrophic factor (CNTF), and glial cell line-derived neurotrophic factor (GDNF), under certain experimental conditions. In cell culture experiments, treatment with oncomodulin has been reported to increase neuronal outgrowth five- to sevenfold compared with untreated controls.

== Mechanism of action ==
For oncomodulin to work properly, it must have elevated levels of cAMP and the sugar mannose, which is present in the vitreous of the eye. cAMP increases the effectiveness of oncomodulin several times more than just having oncomodulin and cAMP alone. Oncomodulin is activated by activating downstream signaling of Ca^{2+}, calmodulin kinase, and gene transcription.

Oncomodulin mRNA production peaks within a day of an inflammatory response. During inflammation, macrophages are released into the eye in order to promote axon regeneration. Inducing an inflammatory response enables the ability of sensory neurons to regenerate their axons through the dorsal roots. The secretion of oncomodulin from macrophages stimulates the growth of neurons. The identity of the receptor for oncomodulin that allows axon regeneration is unknown. It is also unknown whether oncomodulin promotes regeneration elsewhere in the immune system. Signaling complexes that may be important to work with oncomodulin include PI 3 Kinase, MAP Kinase, JAK/STAT, and CaM Kinase II. The depletion of oncomodulin from media in which macrophages grow removes the axon-promoting activity of the media.

Neutrophils are also an important component of oncomodulin activation. Without neutrophils present, macrophages are less effective at stimulating extensive regeneration of neurons. This is because neutrophils enter the area of inflammation before macrophages do. In addition to macrophages, neutrophils are also a major source of oncomodulin production.

== Uses ==
Oncomodulin plays a key role in patients with eye injuries. It is thought that it can reverse eye damage caused from glaucoma. Oncomodulin is also thought to switch on a variety of genes that are associated with axon regrowth. Eye drops with oncomodulin can be a useful method of promoting nerve regrowth in mild cases of optic gliomas. Oncomodulin has also been seen to stimulate outgrowth from peripheral sensory neurons.

Injections with zymosan can promote macrophages to enter the eye and secrete oncomodulin. This is an effective method of treatment in patients with minor eye damage. Injections into patients with severed spinal cords has shown to restore partial motor function.

== See also ==
- Oncomodulin 2
