= Jerusalem Center for Women =

Organization based in Jerusalem

The Jerusalem Center for Women (JCW; Arabic: مركز القدس للنساء) is a feminist organization, established in 1994 as a part of a collaborative feminist effort with Bat Shalom known as the Jerusalem Link. The Jerusalem Center for Women aims to reduce hostilities between Palestine and Israel, as well as advocacy for women's rights in both areas. Most of the tactics utilized by this organization, include advocacy and workshops for community involvement, in addition to voice therapy sessions. The group receives support through international funding and attention.

== History ==
=== Founding ===
The Jerusalem Center for Women was founded in 1994. At the time, the First Intifada had come to a close. The fallout that resulted from the conflict, gave rise to a renewed fervor of hostility from both sides, but also a renewed desire for peace advocacy. There was an idea for a collaborative initiative between an organization of Palestinian origin and an organization of Israeli origin, which was conceived during a 1989 summit on the activities of Palestinian and Israeli female activists. This idea would become the Jerusalem Link, a collaborative effort between one Palestinian and one Israeli group to work together on topics of feminism and peace between Israel and Palestine. Within the Jerusalem Link, the Jerusalem Center for Women represented the Palestinian side of the collaboration. Bat Shalom represented the Israeli side. This collaboration served as both a means to further advocacy goals, and a symbol of collaboration between Palestinian and Israeli people.

=== Aftermath of September 2001 ===
Though the Jerusalem Center for Women had received support at first, the election of President George W. Bush created obstacles that prevented the United States from delivering foreign support to the organization. The priorities of the United States government were altered, and the Israeli-Palestine conflict was not considered as high of a priority as it formerly was. The incident of September 11, 2001 had occurred at the time, and the United States had changed its focus from the Palestinian and Israeli conflict to the activities that occurred in Iraq. This gave rise to a concern among the members of the Jerusalem Link, that the Israeli government could take the opportunity to continue its expansion into Palestinian territories. The Jerusalem Center for Women in response, collaborated with Bat Shalom to ensure that equal rights were maintained while the attention of the United States was elsewhere.

=== Aftermath of Second Intifada ===
While the First Intifada created some support for peace advocacy, the aftermath of the Second Intifada reduced the interest of peace in the conflict. This conflict caused some problems for the Jerusalem Center for Women. The governments in both Israel and Palestine were opposed to the idea of communication across the borders, something that went on to cause somewhat strained relationships between both the Jerusalem Center for Women and Bat Shalom.
Despite this setback, the Jerusalem Center for Women continued their attempt to promote peace and equality. The organization's membership remained strong initially after the Second Intifada, due in large part to the emphasis on equality placed on its structure. During the year 2003, the Jerusalem Center for Women applied a variety of new programs to support and train women on how to advocate for their rights. These new programs were more hands-on approaches, which allowed the group's members to play a more active role in state building. As the years went on however, tensions between the Jerusalem Center for Women and Bat Shalom increased with the hostilities of the Palestine-Israeli conflict.

== Objectives and activities ==
=== Goals and values ===
The main goal of the Jerusalem Center for Women is to advocate for women's right in Israel and Palestine, and train them in ways with which they could influence the building and maintenance of the state through advocacy. The organization also advocates in favor of peace between the Israeli and Palestinian population. In its conduct towards the goal, the Jerusalem Center for Women tries to retain the value of equality through its structure and actions. The organization's location, membership, and leadership try to reflect this value of equality, and has helped it survive past the Second Intifada.

=== Activities ===
In line with its goal of training women to play a more active role in communities, a common method used by the Jerusalem Center for Women is the creation of training camps for women in Palestinian and Israeli communities. These training camps educate women on topics such as politics, leadership, law, and culture. More forms of training would be provided over time. Conflict Resolution Techniques and From Grassroots to Decision-Making for instance, were two training camps led by the Jerusalem Center for Women that sought to convince women to actively advocate for the better of their community.

There were other programs outside of training camps established by the Jerusalem Center for Women within communities. During the earlier years of the organization's history, the Jerusalem Center for Women ran various forums for people to debate and discuss the matters of the Palestine and Israeli conflict. These forums were created as early as 1997, in which said forum consisted of a week of activities. Another method of advocacy that was used often by the Jerusalem Center for Women, came in the form of voice therapy projects. Similar to psychological counseling sessions, members of the Jerusalem Center for Women would hear the grievances of women who had fallen victim or knew of someone who had fallen victim to the Palestine-Israeli conflict.

The Jerusalem Center for Women has also on occasion, attempted to appeal to individuals that held positions of power. The Jerusalem Center for Women was active during International Women's Day for instance, to bring concerns of the organization and community to the Israeli government. The Jerusalem Center for Women and Bat Shalom also worked on an initiative in which they wrote letters advocating for peace, and sent them to be published on the news of both states. The Jerusalem Center for Women has also attempted to make appeals to foreign governments. These appeals would usually be expressed using active language, such as calling the Israeli occupation the catalyst for the violent response that occurred. An example of advocacy towards a foreign government, was a collaborative appeal to the United Nations, as a call to action.

=== Collaboration with Bat Shalom ===
The Jerusalem Center for Women has collaborated with Bat Shalom on multiple occasions. The main goal of maintaining this relationship, was strengthening a sense of unity between Palestine and Israel. The group's relationship was well at first, though there were some obstacles that sometimes impeded with collaboration. Near the beginning of their founding, the Jerusalem Center for Women encountered some disagreement with Bat Shalom regarding the definition of the Palestinian Right of Return. This was early in the formation of the Jerusalem Link, when both groups were constructing their joint guidelines of conduct, known as the Jerusalem Link Declaration of Principles. Though both groups agreed with the position of the Right of Return, they disagreed on a few details. Around 2001 to 2002, this disagreement caused the relationship between both groups to falter further. Both groups eventually agreed to implement their own definition of the Right of Return as equal dignity and rights for Palestinian and Israeli people.

The Jerusalem Center for Women and Bat Shalom held their own symposium as early as 1997, known as "Sharing Jerusalem: Two Capitals for Two States." The Jerusalem Center for Women has also aided Bat Shalom in developing the Women's Emergency Network. The network itself was meant to be a sort of reconnaissance measure, and was created after the United States turned its attention away from the Israeli-Palestinian conflict. The network was designed with the intention of monitoring the activity of Israeli detainment. In the event that there was action being taken against Palestinians, the women from either side would inform Bat Shalom. Both organizations would then work together on these issues.

There was an attempt to maintain the value of balance in control between both groups, during their advocacy projects. When designing and executing these projects, both Palestinian and Israeli members were given platforms with which to speak and lead the organizational efforts. Furthermore, both groups tended to reflect upon the relationship they had with each other, in order to avoid having one group dominate over the other.

== Structure and membership ==
=== Members and location ===
The Jerusalem Center for Women is situated between Palestine and Israel, on an area near the border called the West Bank. This location allows both Palestinian and Israeli people to access the organization. Activities are normally performed on the West Bank, as well as within Israel.

The Jerusalem Center for Women has multiple forms of leadership. The organization has a board of around 8 to 10 women to lead the group, and a group as large as 42 members that makes up an assembly to further discuss matters of leadership. Many of the members that have a position on the organization's board have also worked on the Jerusalem Link, or had joined the organization since its creation. Though there were no elections to determine new leaders for the organization, there would still be some changes in board members from time to time. If a decision was brought up within the organization, it would usually be passed solely by consensus.

The membership of the Jerusalem Center for Women is not entirely composed of these leading bodies however. Some members were hired to handle some of the more administrative roles of the organization. Joining the Jerusalem Center for Women is somewhat difficult, since the organization is more selective in its approach to accepting new members. Demographics are relatively balanced among those from Israel and those from Palestine, though there was a lack of representation from a subset of the Israeli people known as the Mizrahi. This lack of representation was not entirely uncommon, and could have been due to the emphasis on women's rights as a whole instead of having a specific focus on Mizrahi women's rights. Most of the organization's members have some form of education, such as a bachelor's degree or the necessary credentials to hold some government positions.

=== Funding and support ===
The Jerusalem Center for Women has been receiving international aid for a long time. The organization has usually received funding from foreign countries. From the beginning, one of the more prominent supporters for the organization was the European Union, which also supported Bat Shalom. The Jerusalem Center for Women's international funding and support drew the ire from some of the other feminist groups in the area, with the worry that the organization might have been too institutionalized.

Though the Jerusalem Center for Women uses foreign support to help fund their activities, they also seek international support in order to attain a better platform to voice their concerns. To attain this support, the Jerusalem Center for Women usually tries to align its objectives with those of international governments. Sometimes, the activities of the group will have the additional goal of attracting the attention of diplomatic dignitaries to raise awareness internationally.
