= Machsom Watch =

Israeli human rights organization

- Watch מחסום
- Formation: 2001; 25 years ago
- Founder: Ronnee Jaege; Yehudit Keshet; Adi Kuntsman
- Headquarters: Tel Aviv, Israel

Machsom Watch, or Checkpoint Watch, is a human rights organization of Israeli women who monitor and document the conduct of soldiers and policemen at checkpoints in the West Bank. Its members also observe and document the procedures in military courts, and aid Palestinians crossing through IDF checkpoints. Self-described as "politically pluralistic", it is composed entirely of Israeli women who tend to have a "liberal or leftist background". The word machsom is Hebrew for "checkpoint", referring to Israeli Defense Forces checkpoints which control movement between different parts of the West Bank and between the West Bank and Israel.

According to its website, the group's aims are to monitor the behavior of soldiers and police at checkpoints; ensure that the human and civil rights of Palestinians attempting to enter Israel are protected; and record and report the results of their observations to the widest possible audience, from decision-makers to the general public. Some members also see their role as protesting against the existence of the checkpoints.

Machsom Watch has been accused of disrupting the work at the checkpoints and entering restricted areas without permission. In response to the group's contentions regarding the checkpoints, the IDF has implemented training procedures intended to ensure respectful behavior by soldiers.

== History ==
Machsom Watch was founded in 2001 by Ronnee Jaeger, previously a human-rights worker in Guatemala and Mexico; Adi Kuntsman, who arrived in Israel from the Soviet Union in 1990; and Yehudit Keshet, a former Orthodox Jew and scholar of Talmudic ethics, in response to allegations of human-rights violations at IDF and border-police checkpoints. The three activists made a decision to travel to Bethlehem checkpoint so they could observe what was happening there with their own eyes. In a matter of weeks they were joined by 30 female activists who started visiting checkpoints in Jerusalem and the surrounding areas. The organization's first activists were recruited from among members of Women in Black. Membership of the organisation is given to all those who volunteer to participate in monitoring at the checkpoints

By 2002 due to media coverage the organisation had attracted 200 members. Based in Tel Aviv the volunteers began to observe checkpoints in the heart of the West Bank. At its height membership reached 400 volunteers in 2004.

The group has also expressed concern about what they say is "the excessive Israeli response to the Al Aqsa Intifada and the prolonged closure and siege of villages and towns on the West Bank".

== Activities ==
According to the organization's website, its aims are: to safeguard the human rights of the Palestinians in the West Bank; to reverse the policy of denying the Palestinians freedom of movement within the occupied territories; and to influence public opinion in Israel and the world in order to "bring about the end of the destructive occupation that harms Palestinian and Israeli society alike."

=== Observing and documenting soldiers' conduct at checkpoints ===
Machsom Watch volunteers visit the checkpoints in daily shifts of 2–4 hours, morning and afternoon, where they position themselves in proximity to the Israeli soldiers and representatives of other security bodies, so they can monitor their interaction with Palestinians. Volunteers document their observations with notes and photographs. They also try to sway the soldiers to enable the speedy passage of Palestinians and treat them with respect. Intervention is made firstly by directly approaching soldiers, when this is ineffective attempts are made to contact higher military ranks, the media and Israeli politicians.

Volunteers also monitor agricultural gates in the Israeli West Bank barrier and spontaneous, temporary roadblocks. The organization claims that soldiers treat the Palestinian population better when its activists are on the scene, so that their very presence contributes to improving the plight of the Palestinians passing through checkpoints.

Daily reports on the soldiers' conduct at checkpoints are published on the organization's website in Hebrew and English.

=== Observing and documenting in military detention centers and military courts ===
The organization views the detention and incarceration of Palestinians as an additional means of controlling the population and restricting its freedom of movement. Since December 2005 its members have been observing and documenting the legal procedures taking place in the main detention center in the Russian Compound in Jerusalem, the detention center in Petah Tikva, at the central Military Court and Court of Appeals in the Ofer Prison, the military detention facility near Nablus, the Military Court by the village of Salim, Nablus, and the trials of Palestinian residents of East Jerusalem held in Israeli civilian courts. They follow the stages of court deliberations, from extension of remand through verdict and sentencing.

=== Activities in Palestinian villages ===
The organization's activists visit Palestinian villages; conduct joint activities with women there, such as the study of Hebrew, Arabic, and English; act to improve the quality of life in the villages, mainly by assisting with contacts with the Civil Administration; and report on IDF actions, such as the dispersal of a demonstration in Kafr Qaddum by the use of tear gas.

Machsom Watch volunteers also visited Awarta following the Itamar attack in 2011, and reported on harm caused to the residents in the course of the IDF's operations, which it described as collective punishment.

=== Aid with bureaucratic issues ===
A special team of volunteers helps Palestinians whom the Shin Bet have prohibited from entering Israel for the purpose of working or conducting trade, or from going abroad. Another team aids Palestinians whom the Israeli Police has prohibited from entering Israel in an attempt to solve bureaucratic problems. In addition, activists provide aid toward the development of the water and electricity infrastructure in villages through contacts with the District Coordination Offices in the West Bank and by submitting appeals on behalf of Palestinians whose agricultural lands have been trapped in the "Seam Zone".

=== Interaction with the public ===
Activists lead tours in the central West Bank, the Jordan Valley, and Jerusalem and its environs in Hebrew and in English. The tours run along routes that contain checkpoints and roadblocks, and the participants meet with Palestinians in their villages. In addition, members conduct "virtual tours" in the homes of those who request them.

Encounters and tours are also conducted with a variety of audiences, including participants in pre-military preparatory programs, kibbutz youngsters, members of youth movements, and students.

== Organizational structure ==
Machsom Watch is a women's organization. Its activities are on a voluntary basis and are carried out in four regions: Jerusalem and the central, northern, and southern regions of the West Bank. Decisions are taken by the vote of its overall membership, and membership is open to any woman who identifies with the organization's political agenda, i.e. opposition to the occupation and the policy pursued in the occupied territories. Decisions are voted upon at the organization's general meetings, in which every member can take part in determining matters of principle related to the organization's activities. The general meeting approves the composition of the organization's secretariat (containing representatives of the various regions and of the general membership). The secretariat is the body the coordinates activities on the national level.

== Beit-Iba checkpoint violin incident ==
On 9 November 2004, members of Machsom Watch released a video of IDF soldiers requiring Wissam Tayam, a Palestinian violinist, to play his instrument at a checkpoint. The IDF announced that the soldier had acted insensitively and reprimanded him, but later declared that the violinist had played voluntarily. The violinist later rejected the IDF's assessment, stating that he never offered to play and that the soldiers had asked him to do so. The Machsom Watch observers said that they did not hear the discussion between the violinist and the soldiers, and that they did not speak Tayam's language, which is Arabic. A month after the incident, Tayam was invited to attend a seminar for violinists at a kibbutz in Western Galilee.

== Criticism ==
During a two-hour meeting with members of the group in March 2006, IDF Chief of Staff Dan Halutz told the women that: "Humanitarianism is not exclusively owned by Machsom Watch and it is tested not only at the checkpoints, but also in preventing suicide bombers from reaching the markets of Tel Aviv and Netanya."

In fall 2008, company commanders in the Military Police's Taoz Battalion began filming Machsom Watch's activities as a result of repeated complaints from soldiers that Machsom Watch and similar organizations were disrupting the work at the checkpoints and entering restricted areas without permission.

In 2006, a soldier complained that Machsom Watch activists had verbally attacked him, calling him a "Nazi" and other profanities as he asked Palestinians to stand in line for an ID check at a checkpoint leading into Israel. The woman involved in the incident subsequently apologized.

Machsom Watch has refused to aid Palestinians who were tortured by Palestinian Authority in their battle for compensation for the torture, arguing that doing so would legitimize the Israeli occupation, and that its role as a political organization (opposing the occupation) conflicts here with its role in securing human rights.

== Support and awards ==
In March 2004, the group was awarded the Emil Grunzweig Human Rights Award by the Association for Civil Rights in Israel for "their remarkable activities and ongoing surveillance of operations of the armed forces at checkpoints in the occupied territories, at a time of general indifference and waning sensitivity to the human rights of Palestinians".

In an editorial of March 8, 2006, Haaretz argued that organizations like Machsom Watch should not be viewed negatively in Israel: "This organization – like other human rights organizations, each of which focuses on a different consequence of the occupation – is the least that Israeli citizens can do to try to prevent injustices stemming from the occupation. Life under the anomaly of an occupation regime produces strange solutions, such as the presence of women alongside soldiers in an effort to ensure a more humane routine. The human rights organizations are the state's pride, not a threat that must be liquidated or minimized."

== See also ==
- Coalition of Women for a Just Peace
