= Bat Shalom =

Joint Israeli-Palestinian feminist private organization

- Formation: September 1993
- Founded at: Brussels
- Dissolved: 2006
- Type: Non-governmental organization
- Legal status: Inactive
- Headquarters: Jerusalem
- Key people: Hagar Roublev
- Parent organization: The Jerusalem Link
- Affiliations: Coalition of Women for Peace, Jerusalem Center for Women
- Website: batshalom.org

Bat Shalom is one of the organizations of the Coalition of Women for a Just Peace. They are a feminist Israeli-Palestinian non-governmental organization, a merging of two previous organizations: Israel's Bat Shalom, and the Jerusalem Center for Women. They work together through another group, The Jerusalem Link. Their main goal is to resolve the Israeli-Palestinian conflict, with resolutions for Israeli and Palestinian women as their highest priorities. They also created a list of specific goals in mind that they believe must be essential to the overall resolution of the Israeli-Palestinian conflict.

== History ==
In 1989, prominent Israeli and Palestinian women peace activists convened a meeting in Brussels. The meeting initiated an ongoing dialogue that in 1994 resulted in the establishment of The Jerusalem Link comprising two women's organizations—Bat Shalom on the Israeli side, and the Jerusalem Center for Women on the Palestinian side.

== See also ==
- Israeli–Palestinian conflict
- Anarchists Against the Wall
- Arab–Israeli conflict
- Machsom Watch
- Yesh Din
- Shovrim Shtika (Breaking the Silence)
- Machsom Watch
- Rabbis for Human Rights
- The Jerusalem Fund
