= Coalition of Women for Peace =

Israeli-Palestinian anti-occupation organization

- Abbreviation: CWP
- Founded: 2000
- Type: Non-profit; NGO
- Purpose: "bringing together women from a wide variety of identities and groups."
- Region served: Israel and the Palestinian territories
- Method: "public campaigns and education and outreach programs, working to develop and integrate a feminist discourse on all levels of society."
- Website: Official site (English)

The Coalition of Women for Peace (Hebrew: קואליציית נשים לשלום) is an umbrella organization of women's groups in Israel, established in November 2000. It describes itself as "a feminist organization against the occupation of Palestine and for a just peace.". CWP says that it is "committed to ending the occupation and creating a more just society, while enhancing women’s inclusion and participation in the public discourse".

The groups that founded the Coalition of Women for Peace are Machsom Watch, Noga Feminist Journal, Women in Black, The Fifth Mother, TANDI, Bat Shalom, New Profile and NELED.

The Coalition of Women for Peace came to an agreement on their principles for a solution of the Israeli-Palestinian conflict at a conference in Nazareth in November 2000.

1. the struggle to end the occupation on the basis of two states for two peoples
2. Jerusalem as two capitals for two states
3. a just solution to the refugee problem based on UN resolutions
4. involvement of women in peace negotiations
5. reducing Israel's militarism
6. social and economic justice for all
7. equal citizenship of the Palestinian citizens and integration of Israel into the Middle East

In 2009 the Coalition of Women for Peace held a series of ideological and political debates to revise these principles to reflect the current positions of its activists. This includes a political solution based on historical justice and international law (recognizing the two state solution as only one possible outcome) and support for the Right of Return of Palestinian refugees.

== View on Palestinian Statehood Bid ==
CWP released a statement in September 2011 saying that a "mere declaration of statehood in the West Bank and Gaza Strip is incapable of ending decades of occupation and racial discrimination based on legal mechanisms that match the UN definition of apartheid, to solve the refugee problem or to lead to civil equality between Jews and Palestinians citizens of Israel. These issues can only be resolved in a just agreement to end the occupation while maintaining the basic individual and collective rights of Palestinians, wherever they reside. We call for ending the occupation, maintaining the Palestinians right of return and the right to resist the occupation by all legitimate and popular forms of resistance acceptable by international norms."?

== Controversy ==
CWP was one of several non-profits whose funding by the New Israel Fund caused controversy because of CWP's support for some aspects of the BDS - boycott, divestment and sanctions campaign against Israel. The funding by the NIF caused a row in Australia where the NIF was opening a new branch. It was at this time, in May 2011, that the NIF decided to abruptly halt all funding to CWP, despite statements to the contrary. CWP posted on its website scathing letters to the NIF, saying "It seems particularly unfortunate that the exact timing of cutting off the relations of NIF and CWP has been dictated by NGO Monitor." and "The public attitude of NIF in relation to CWP is a rather disgraceful example of following and accepting the right-wing discourse and its strategies."
