= Charities Advisory Trust =

UK-based registered charity

Peace Oil is an initiative of the Charities Advisory Trust, a UK-based registered charity, led by Hilary Blume which supports fund-raising by other charitable organisations. The charity describes the olive oil as "produced in Israel by Jews, Arabs, Druze and Bedouin working together ...(it) encourages co-operation between communities". The olives are grown in the foothills of the Carmel Mountains and pressed within hours of picking to produce extra virgin olive oil. The project has been running since 2006 when the oil was launched at an Israel Expo Day organised by the Zionist Federation of Great Britain and Ireland, which promoted it as a way "to support Israel’s vibrant trade...to make a difference to the actual future of Israel."

== Criticism ==
Olive trees and oil have been central to disputes in the Israeli-occupied territories with accounts of the destruction of Palestinian olive groves. The Charities Advisory Trust has been asked to explain which disadvantaged communities benefit from this enterprise and to justify their claims about the benefits of Peace Oil. A competing Palestinian company has suggested that the oil is a distraction from fairly traded oil being produced by Palestinian farmers in the occupied territories.

An unrelated product, marketed in the US as Peace Oil, is produced from Palestinian olives, and marketed in cooperation with Israeli and Palestinian Fair Trade groups. According to supporters, "Unlike the London version, it is mostly olive oil from the West Bank where economic assistance is most needed".

== See also ==
- Zaytoun (organisation)
