= Peace Oil (United States) =

American brand of olive oil

Peace Oil is an American brand of olive oil produced from Palestinian olives, and marketed in cooperation with Israeli and Palestinian fair trade groups.

Olive trees and oil have been central to disputes in the Israeli-occupied territories, with documented accounts of the destruction of Palestinian olive groves.

Peace Oil is unrelated to the similarly named Peace Oil, a British brand that is produced in Israel using labour from the Arab, Druze and Bedouin communities and benefits entirely the Israeli economy. According to supporters of Peace Oil: "Unlike the London version, it is mostly olive oil from the West Bank where economic assistance is most needed".
