= Women in Black =

Women's anti-war movement

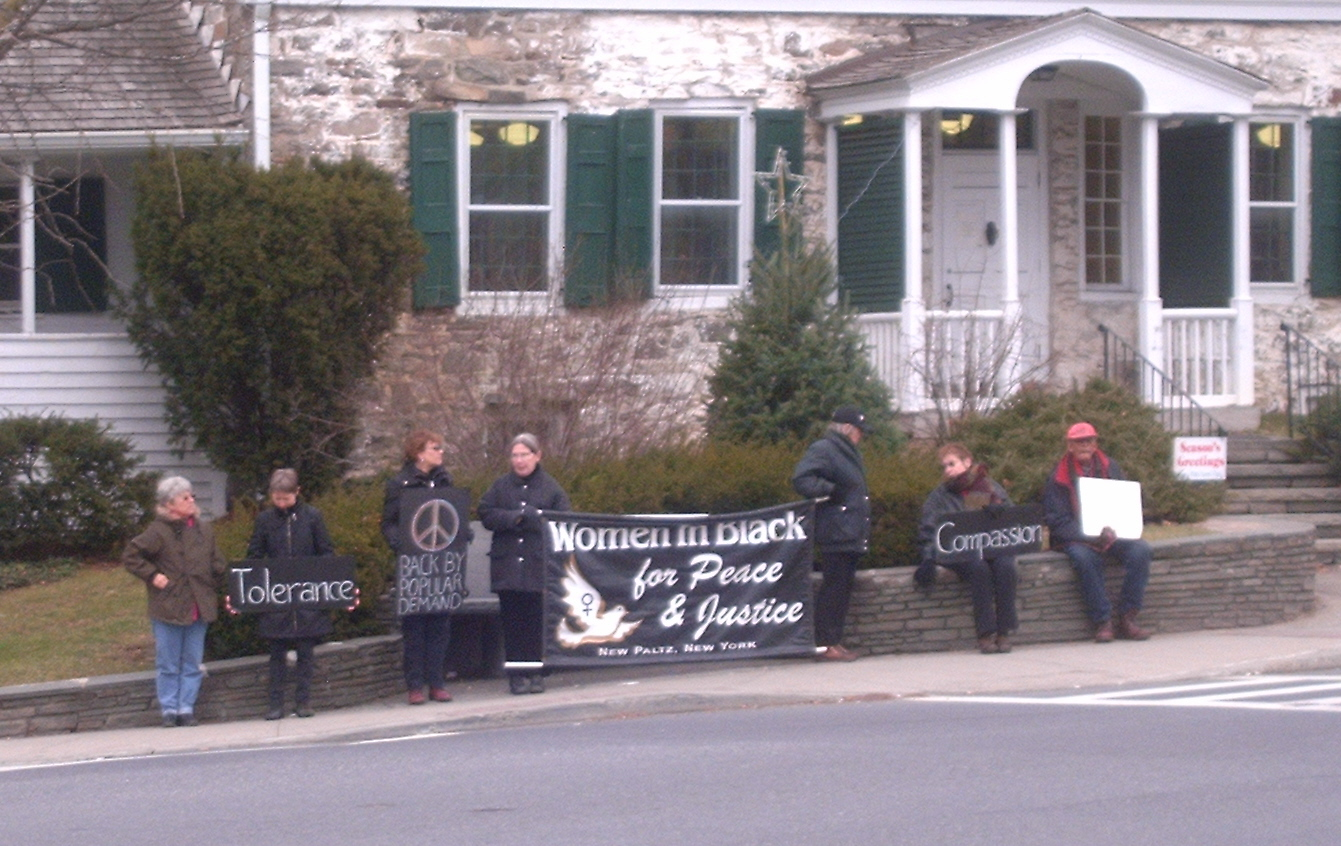
Women in Black staging a protest in New Paltz, New York

Women in Black (Hebrew: נשים בשחור, romanized: Nashim BeShahor) is a women's anti-war movement with an estimated 10,000 activists around the world. The first group was formed by Israeli women in Jerusalem in 1988, following the outbreak of the First Intifada.

== History ==
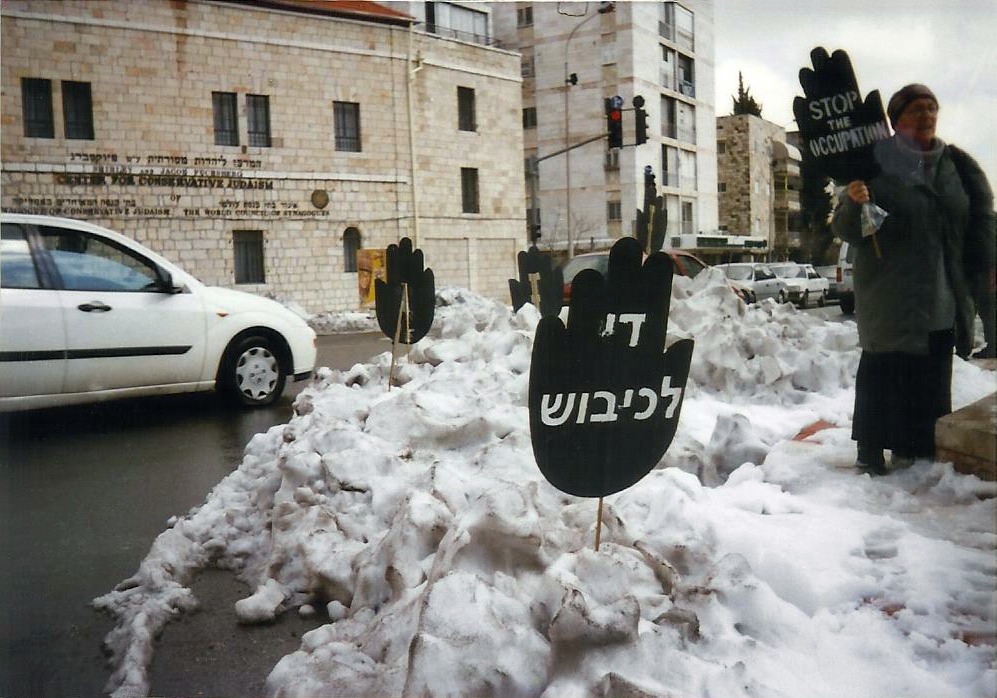
Women in Black staging a protest in Paris Square (Jerusalem) with the distinctive black stop signs calling "Stop the Occupation" in three languages

Responding to what they considered serious violations of human rights by Israeli soldiers in the Occupied Territories, the women held a vigil every Friday in central Jerusalem, wearing black clothing in mourning for all victims of the conflict. Initially the group had no name but it was quickly identified with the black clothing, which also helped create distinctive demonstrations which were hard to ignore.

The initiative soon spread to various other locations in Israel, with women standing weekly in main squares of cities or at junctions on inter-city highways. As was decided early on, the movement did not adopt any formal program other than opposition to the occupation. Local groups were autonomous in deciding such issues as whether or not to open participation to men as well as women, and there were many shades of political difference from one place to another.

At the peak of the Intifada there were thirty vigils in different locations throughout the country. The number dwindled sharply after the Oslo Agreement in 1993, when it seemed that peace with the Palestinians was at hand, and picked up again when violent events proved that hope to have been premature.

The first vigils in other countries were started in solidarity with the Israeli group, but then embraced other social and political issues. Especially notable were the Women in Black group in former Yugoslavia, which in the 1990s confronted rampant nationalism, hatred and bloodshed, often meeting with violence from nationalists.

Women in Black in India stands against Hindu Fundamentalism and the violence it inflicted upon women. Women in Black in Italy protest against war and organized crimes. In Australia, WIB stands against domestic violence.

While each group is free to pursue its own goals and activities, the women maintain regular contact via e-mail and the Internet, and hold annual international conferences. Their most common tactic consists of standing together periodically in various public places, usually in complete silence unless pedestrians ask questions, which at times escalate into full-fledged arguments. The Women in Black's counter-group is called Women for Israel's Tomorrow who typically wear green hats.

The 2015 WIB gathering took place in India, Bangalore with the participation of several feminist organizations.

== Political position ==
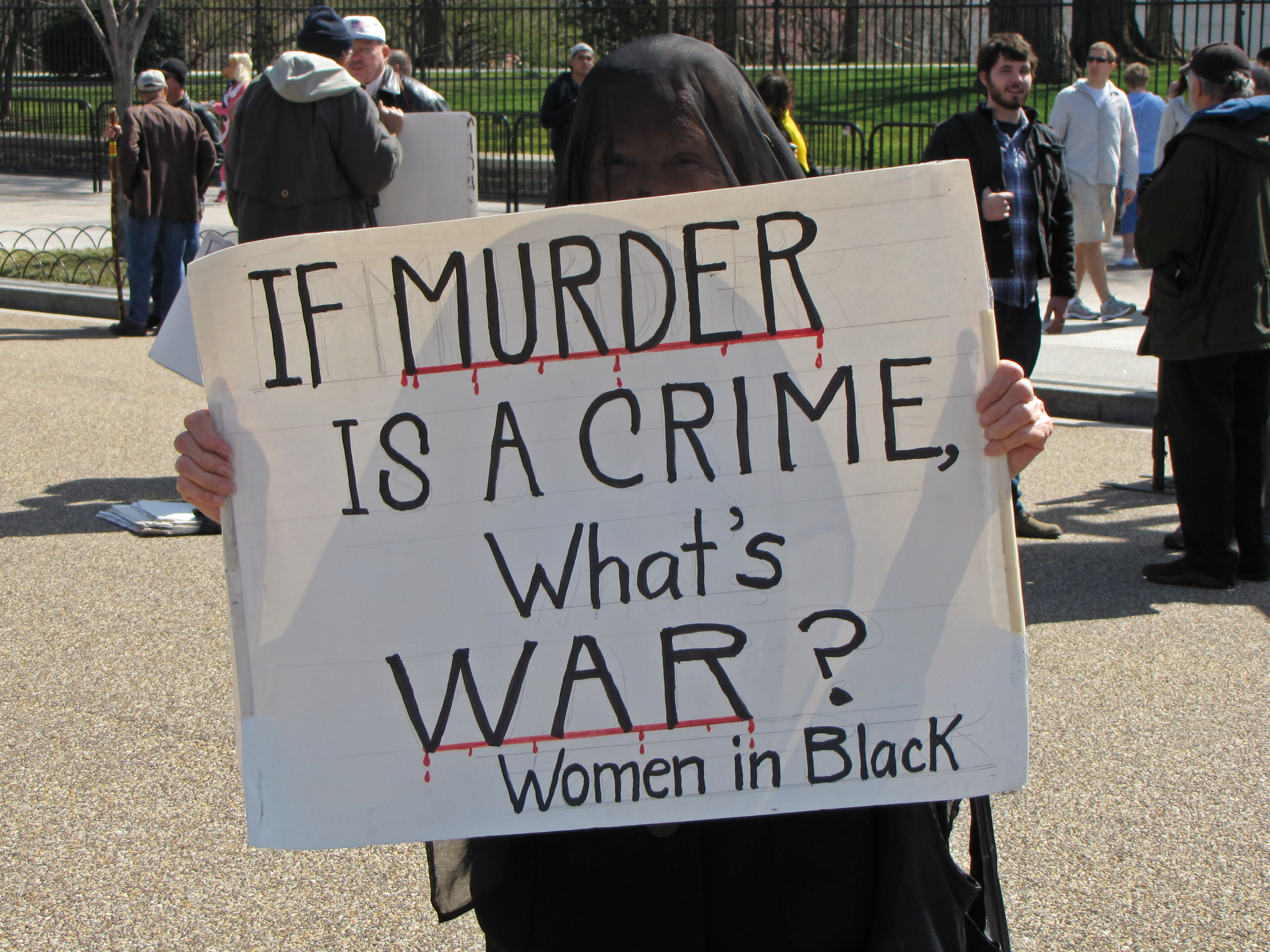
A woman in black at an anti-war rally in 2011

In Israel, Women in Black belongs to the radical left. The organization supports the BDS movement.

== Awards ==
In 2001, the movement was awarded the Millennium Peace Prize for Women given by the United Nations Development Fund for Women. The same year, the Israeli and Serbian groups were nominated for Nobel Peace Prize.

== See also ==
- Coalition of Women for a Just Peace
- Code Pink
- Erella Shadmi

== Bibliography ==
- Herr, Kathryn G.; Anderson, Gary L. (2007). Encyclopedia of activism and social justice. Thousand Oaks: SAGE Publications. pp. 1477–1479. ISBN 9781452265650.
- Shadmi, Erella; Frankfort-Nachmias, Chava (2005). Sappho in the Holy Land : lesbian existence and dilemmas in contemporary Israel. Albany: State University of New York Press. pp. 191–210. ISBN 9780791463185.
