= Alliance for Middle East Peace =

Group of Palestinian/Israeli NGOs

- Formation: 2006
- Founder: Avi Meyerstein
- Headquarters: Washington, D.C., United States
- President: Avi Meyerstein
- Regional director: Nivine Sandouka

The Alliance for Middle East Peace (ALLMEP) is a group of over 100 leading non-governmental organizations working to foster reconciliation between Israelis and Palestinians, and between Arabs and Jews in Israel and the wider region.

One of ALLMEP's proposals is an independent International Fund for Israeli-Palestinian Peace to support and encourage efforts to build peace in the region. ALLMEP’s initial advocacy in Washington secured dedicated funds for these organizations within the Office of Conflict Management and Mitigation of USAID. ALLMEP later widened its plan, in order to establish an International Fund for Israeli-Palestinian Peace modeled on the International Fund for Ireland which played a notable role in creating a sustainable resolution in Northern Ireland.

== History ==
ALLMEP began as an informal coalition in late 2003. The group first convened in February 2004, at the first annual Middle East coexistence conference on Capitol Hill in Washington, DC. ALLMEP was formally incorporated in 2006. It grew from 14 organizations in 2004 to 27 in 2005 and 44 NGOs in 2007.

ALLMEP has met with USAID and State Department officials, including at its event in Jerusalem in 2006 which included NGO representatives and U.S. diplomats. It also has ongoing contact with appropriate U.S. officials responsible for NGO funding.

ALLMEP hosts an annual event in Washington. In June 2005, ALLMEP held a summer conference on coexistence. The event included Middle East ambassadors, Jewish and Muslim religious leaders, members of Congress, State Department officials, leading pro-Israel and pro-Arab activists, Middle East NGO activists to discuss ALLMEP's agenda of coexistence. More than 250 participated, including diplomats from Tunisia, Yemen, Sweden, Saudi Arabia, and Afghanistan.

The programming included a panel discussion by Egyptian Ambassador Fahmy, Jordanian Prince Firas bin Raad, Palestinian Chief Representative Hassan Abdel Rahman, Luxembourg Ambassador (during EU presidency) Arlette Conzemius-Paccoud, and former U.S. Ambassador Philip Wilcox of the Washington Middle East Institute. ALLMEP members also met with over 30 congressional offices, regarding the NGOs work on reconciliation.

In March 2006, ALLMEP co-sponsored a reception and screening of a new documentary film about coexistence efforts, Encounter Point. In conjunction with this event, ALLMEP and JustVision representatives met with more than 37 congressional offices.

In March 2009, the summit members of ALLMEP met with members of Congress, the Department of State, USAID, and the White House. As interest increased for the idea of the IFFIPP, the Alliance doubled its number of meetings in 2009 compared to 2008, and met with over ten percent of Congressional offices.

== Selected member organizations ==
- A Land for All
- A New Dawn in the Negev
- The Abraham Initiatives
- Adva Center
- Arab-Jewish Center for Equality, Empowerment and Cooperation
- Arava Institute for Environmental Studies
- Auburn Theological Seminary
- Center for Israel Studies (Jordan)
- Churches for Middle East Peace
- Circle of Health International
- Combatants for Peace
- Economic Cooperation Foundation
- EcoOcean
- EcoPeace Middle East
- Ehvam
- Givat Haviva
- Hand in Hand: Center for Jewish-Arab Education
- Interfaith Center for Sustainable Development
- Interfaith Encounter Association
- Jerusalem International YMCA
- Neve Shalom – Wahat al Salam
- OneVoice Movement
- Our Generation Speaks
- The Parents Circle-Families Forum
- PeacePlayers
- Project Rozana
- Rabbis for Human Rights
- Road to Recovery
- Search For Common Ground
- Seeds of Peace
- Shalom Hartman Institute
- Shorouq Society for Women
- Tech2Peace
- Tomorrow's Women
- Tomorrow's Youth Organization
- Tsofen
- University of the Middle East Project
- Women of the Sun
- Women Wage Peace

== See also ==
- Israeli-Palestinian peace process
- Projects working for peace among Arabs and Israelis
- Trade Unions Linking Israel and Palestine
- Valley of Peace initiative
