= Gershon Baskin =

Israeli columnist and political activist

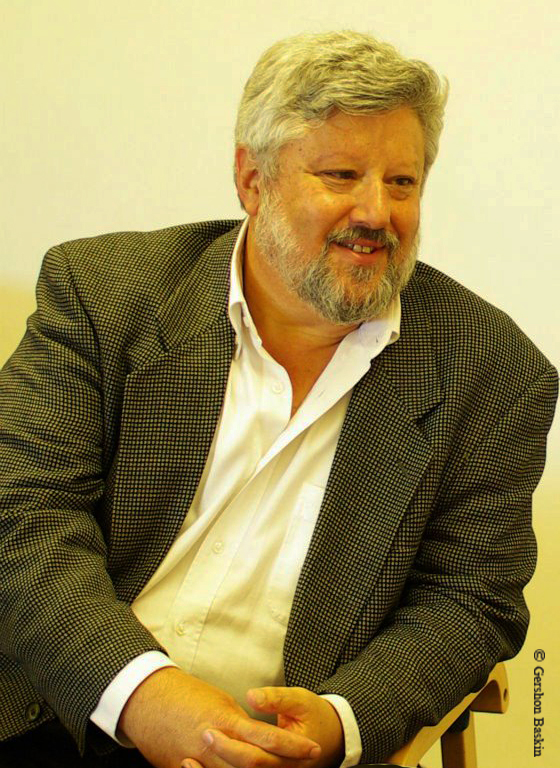
Gershon Baskin

Gershon Baskin (Hebrew: גרשון בסקין; born 2 May 1956) is an American-born Israeli columnist, peace activist, and researcher of the Israeli–Palestinian conflict and peace process.

Baskin is the Middle East Director of International Communities Organisation, a London-based NGO working in conflict zones with failed peace processes. In February 2025, Baskin and Samer Sinijlawi, founded the Alliance for Two States.

== Biography ==
Born to a Jewish family in New York City, Baskin became involved in the civil rights movement and the anti–Vietnam War movement during his time as a teenager. In 1978, Baskin received his BA from New York University in the politics and history of the Middle East. He received his MA (1992) and Ph.D. (1994) from Greenwich University in International Relations. His Ph.D. dissertation was on Territory and Sovereignty in the Future of Jerusalem, parts of which became a book, Jerusalem of Peace, published by IPCRI.

=== Activity in Israel, 1978–2011 ===
In September 1978, he immigrated to Israel, where he joined the Interns for Peace program. In Interns for Peace from 1979 to 1981, he lived in Kafr Qara, a Palestinian Arab village in Israel, where he worked as a community organizer and youth leader beginning to build bridges between the Israeli Palestinian community of Kafr Qara and nearby Israeli Jewish communities.

In 1982, Baskin served in the Israeli Ministry of Education as coordinator of education for co-existence between the Jewish and Arab school systems. In that position that he created, he became Israel's first civil servant responsible for the relations between the Jewish and Palestinian citizens of Israel.

In 1983, under the auspices of the Prime Minister's office and the Ministry of Education, Baskin founded and directed the Institute for Education for Jewish Arab Coexistence, which was funded by the Hanns Seidel Foundation.

After the outbreak of the first Intifada in March 1988, Baskin founded the Israel/Palestine Center for Research and Information (IPCRI), later renamed Israel Palestine Creative Regional Initiatives, dedicated to the resolution of the Israeli–Palestinian conflict on the basis of a "two-states for two peoples" solution. He served as its co-chairman until January 2012. IPCRI was a joint Israeli-Palestinian public policy think and do-tank. Baskin co-directed IPCRI for 24 years from 1988 until the end of 2011.

In mid-1989, Baskin launched in IPCRI the first three Israeli–Palestinian working groups: Economics and Business, the Future of Jerusalem, and the water experts working group.

In October 1992, Baskin initiated a series of secret meetings in London with former Israeli security officers and Palestinian officials from the PLO. These talks laid down the framework for subsequent security undertaking in the Oslo Accords of September 1993. In 1994, Baskin became an outside adviser on the peace process to a secret team of intelligence officers established by Prime Minister Yitzhak Rabin. In 24 years as Co-Director of IPCRI, Baskin, alongside Zakaria al Qaq and Hanna Siniora, organized and facilitated over 2,000 Israeli-Palestinian working group meetings on topics such as security, economy, water, and peace education.

=== Gilad Shalit negotiations (2006–2011) ===
In July 2006, six days after Gilad Shalit was abducted in Gaza, Baskin unofficially opened a back channel with Hamas. Three months later Baskin successfully got Hamas to deliver a hand written letter from Shalit to his parents which was brought to the Office of the Egyptian Government in Gaza. He continued his behind the scenes efforts to negotiate a deal between Israel and Hamas throughout the five years and four months that Shalit was in captivity. He became the official intermediary between senior Hamas officials and senior Israeli Mossad Officer David Meidan in April 2011. Baskin's main interlocutor in Hamas was Deputy Foreign Minister Ghazi Hamad. Baskin was involved in efforts to secure Shalit's release for more than five years. Baskin's efforts are detailed in his book The Negotiator: Freeing Gilad Shalit from Hamas.

=== Continued talks with Hamas (2011–2023) ===
Immediately after Shalit's return, Baskin and Hamas began discussing the possibility of negotiating a long-term ceasefire agreement between Israel and Hamas. On 1 May 2012, Baskin presented the fourth draft of the proposed agreement to Israeli Defense Minister Ehud Barak. Barak formed a high level committee, composed of officials from the security establishment, to discuss the proposal. After two months, the committee decided against entering into a formal agreement with Hamas even if, as proposed, it were negotiated and formalized through the Egyptian General Intelligence Directorate.

In the beginning of November 2012, Baskin and Hamad met in Cairo, where they spoke with Egyptian intelligence officers and discussed possible long-term ceasefire arrangements. On 14 November 2012, Hamad met with Ahmad Jabari, the Head of Izz ad-Din al-Qassam Brigades (the military wing of Hamas) and presented him with the seventh draft of the long-term ceasefire proposal. Later that day Israel killed Jabari in an air strike and started Operation Pillar of Defense.

Even after the assassination of Jabari, Baskin and Hamad remained in contact and continued to negotiate, primarily for the release of the bodies of the two Israeli soldiers killed in Gaza in 2014, Oron Shaul and Hadar Goldin, as well as the two Israeli civilians who were proven to be alive Avera Mengisto and Hisham as-Sayed. Baskin continued to negotiate in coordination with the Israeli officials coordinating Israel's efforts Lior Lotan and Yaron Blum.

=== 2023–present ===
After the 7 October attacks, Baskin continued his efforts to bring about the release of hostages taken to Gaza by Hamas, Islamic Jihad, the PFLP, and individuals. Baskin has been in contact with authorities in Qatar, Egyptian Intelligence, and the Israeli government and intelligence community authorities. Days after the October 7 attack, Baskin begin negotiating (unofficially) for the release of all of the women and children hostages in exchange for the women and minor Palestinian prisoners. Baskin communicated with members of the Israeli War Cabinet.

Shortly after the October 7 attack, Baskin cut ties with Hamad who became the Hamas spokesperson for the war and on Lebanese television justified the attack, the killing of innocent Israelis and promised that Hamas would repeat this attack over and over.

As the Gaza war continued and with the hope of trying to save the lives of more Israeli hostages and innocent Palestinians in Gaza, he renewed his contacts with Hamad and other Hamas leaders. Baskin was also in contact with authorities in Qatar, Egyptian Intelligence, and the Israeli government and intelligence community authorities. In September 2024, Baskin received the agreement of the Hamas leadership through Ghazi Hamad for “The Three Weeks Deal” during which time Hamas would release all of the remaining Israeli and foreign hostages, the war would end, Israel would withdraw from Gaza and release an agreed to number and names of Palestinian prisoners.

In July 2025, he reported that Hamas also "is prepared for there to be a Palestinian professional civilian government take control of Gaza ... and that Hamas will not be part of that government."

==== Other back channels ====
In 2022–2023 (prior to 7 October), Baskin was running three separate secret back channels between significant Israelis and Palestinians mainly looking toward the "day after" political changes would take place in Israel and Palestine. One of the back channels was between former Israeli Prime Minister Ehud Olmert and former Palestinian Foreign Minister Nasser Alkidwa. Working together with longtime Fatah activist Samer Sinijlawi, they negotiated a joint proposal for the future signed by Olmert and Alkidwa in July 2024.

The joint proposal also brings forward the Two States Solution based in the June 4, 1967 lines, with an agreed to 4.4% land swap and a solution for Jerusalem, based on two capitals in Jerusalem and the Old City of Jerusalem under a Trusteeship of five countries including Israel and Palestine.

=== Other activities ===
Since stepping down as co-director of IPCRI on 31 December 2011, Baskin became the co-chairman of the Board of IPCRI until April 2018.

He was a member of the steering committee of the Israeli Palestinian Peace NGO Forum until 2016, a member of the Board of Directors of ALLMEP – the Alliance for Middle East Peace, also until 2016, and was a member of the Israeli Board of One Voice Movement. He remains a member of the editorial committee of the Palestine–Israel Journal.

As part of their ICO activity, in August 2021, Baskin joined James Holmes in establishing the Holy Land Bond, a new investment fund registered in the UK, aimed at investing in housing projects for Palestinians in East Jerusalem, integrated housing projects for Jewish and Palestinian citizens of Israel in Israel's "mixed cities", and employment and industrial zones that are either cross-boundary Israeli-Palestinian, or for Jewish and Palestinian citizens of Israel.

He is co-director of the newly formed International Communities Organisation – Middle East Branch, which is connected to the UK-based International Communities Organisation (ICO).

=== Journalism ===
Baskin was a columnist for The Jerusalem Post between 2005 and 2023. His weekly column is currently published in English in the blog pages of The Times of Israel, as well as in the Palestinian Al Quds newspaper in Arabic and Hebrew.

== Awards ==
Baskin has been awarded:

- The Histadrut Prize for Peace in 1996
- The Turkish Foreign Policy Institute Peace Prize in 2004
- The Tribute of Honor and Courage from the World Movement for Democracy in 2004
- The Search for Common Ground Journalist Award for Middle East Journalism named for Lova Eliav and Issam Sartawi in 2005 and 2007
- The Ordine Della Stella Della Solidarieta Italiana by the President of Italy in 2007.
- Luxembourg Peace Prize for 2023 Outstanding Peace Activist.

== Publications (books) ==
Baskin has published thousands of oped articles in many publications.

- Baskin, G. In Pursuit of Peace in Israel and Palestine, Vanderbilt University Press, 2017 ISBN 978-0-8265-2181-1 Vanderbilt University Press
- Baskin G., Geva O. and Praver L. "At the Crossroads", The Institute for Education for Jewish-Arab Coexistence and the Van Leer Institute, May 1985.
- Baskin G., Abu Namir M. and Nasser I, "My Responsibility – To Myself and My Community", The Institute for Education for Jewish Arab Coexistence, Autumn 1987 (Arabic).
- Baskin G. "Water – Conflict or Cooperation", (Ed.) Israel/Palestine Issue Of Conflict, Issues For Cooperation, Volume 1, Number 2. May 1992. IPCRI.
- Baskin G. "A Model Agreement for the Interim Period: Palestinian Self Rule", Revised Edition. Israel/Palestine Issues in Conflict, Issues for Cooperation. Volume 1, Number 3, June 1992. IPCRI.
- Baskin G. and Twite R. (eds.) "The Future of Jerusalem, Proceedings of the First Israeli-Palestinian Seminar on the Future of Jerusalem", IPCRI, March 1993.
- Baskin G. and Twite R. (eds.) "The Conversion of Dreams, The Development of Tourism in the Middle East", IPCRI, November 1994
- Baskin G. and Smith T. (eds.) "Handbook for Palestinian Businesses, How to Conduct Business in the Palestinian Territories", January 1996, The Small Business Support Project, DAI, USAID.
- Huleileh S., Feiler G., Baskin G. and al Qaq Z. (eds.) "Guidelines for Final Status Economic Negotiations Between Israel and Palestine", IPCRI Commercial Report Series, November 1998.
- Baskin G. and al Qaq Z. (eds.) "Israeli-Palestinian-Jordanian Trade: Present Issues, Future Possibilities", IPCRI, April 1998.
- Baskin G. and al Qaq Z. "A Reevaluation of the Border Industrial Estates Concept", IPCRI Commercial Report Series, December 1998.
- Baskin G. and al Qaq Z. (eds.) "Creating a Culture of Peace" IPCRI, January 1999.
- Baskin G., "Jerusalem of peace: Sovereignty and territory in Jerusalem's future", IPCRI, 1994
- Baskin G., "New thinking on the future of Jerusalem: a model for the future of Jerusalem : scattered sovereignty: the IPCRI plan", 1994
- Baskin G. "The Future of the Israeli Settlements in Final Status Negotiations: A Policy Paper Featuring Recommendations for Negotiations in the Final Status Talks Between Israel and the Palestinians", IPCRI, 1997
- Baskin G., "Yes PM – Years of Experience in Strategies of Peace Making", IPCRI 2002
- Baskin G., The Negotiator: Freeing Gilad Schalit from Hamas, Toby Press, Jerusalem 2013, ISBN 978-1592643493
