= Middle East University =

Middle East University may refer to:

- Middle East University (Jordan), in Amman
- Middle East University (Lebanon), in Beirut
- Middle East Technical University, Ankara, Turkiye

It may also refer to:

- American University of the Middle East, Kuwait
- University of the Middle East Project, an NGO for MENA based in the USA

== See also ==
- Middle East (disambiguation)
- Eastern University (disambiguation)
- University of the East
