= 2021 Mediterranean oil spill =

Ship spill impacting the coast of Israel and Lebanon in February 2021

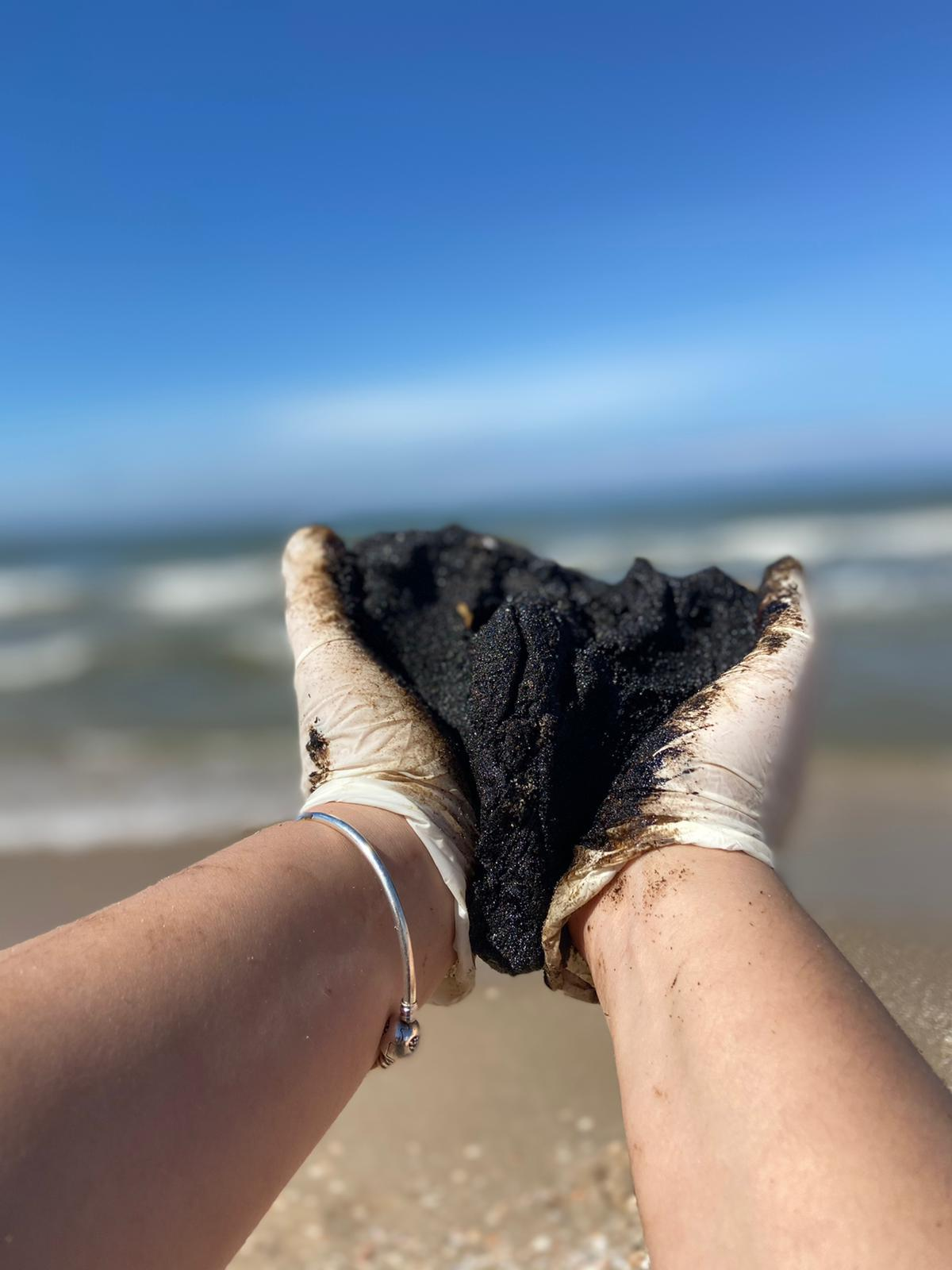
A lump of tar raised by a volunteer cleaning up the Nitzanim beach, 20 February 2021

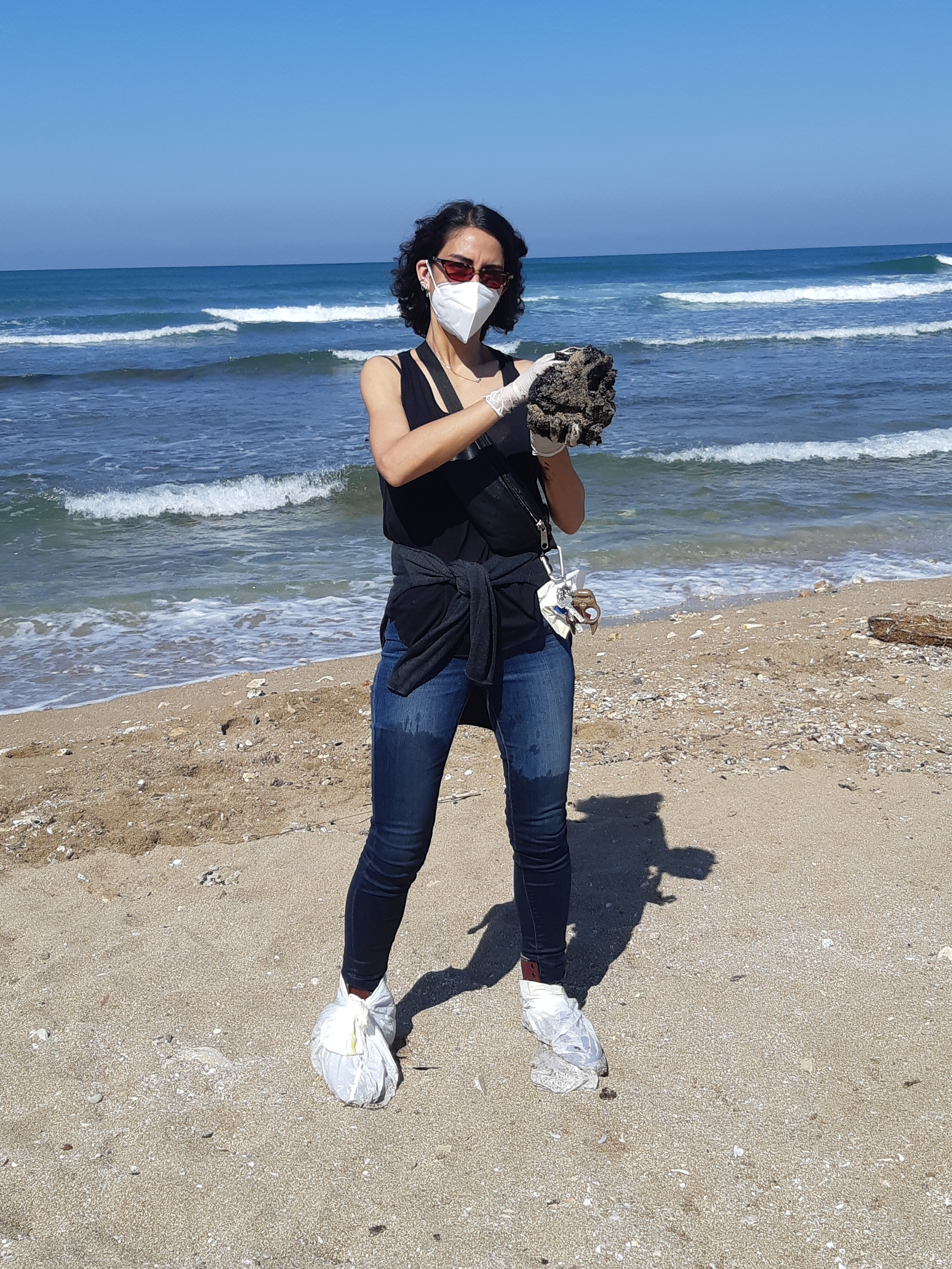
A volunteer holds a large lump of tar collected from smaller lumps, on the beach of Hubert Humphrey Street in Haifa on Friday, 26 February 2021

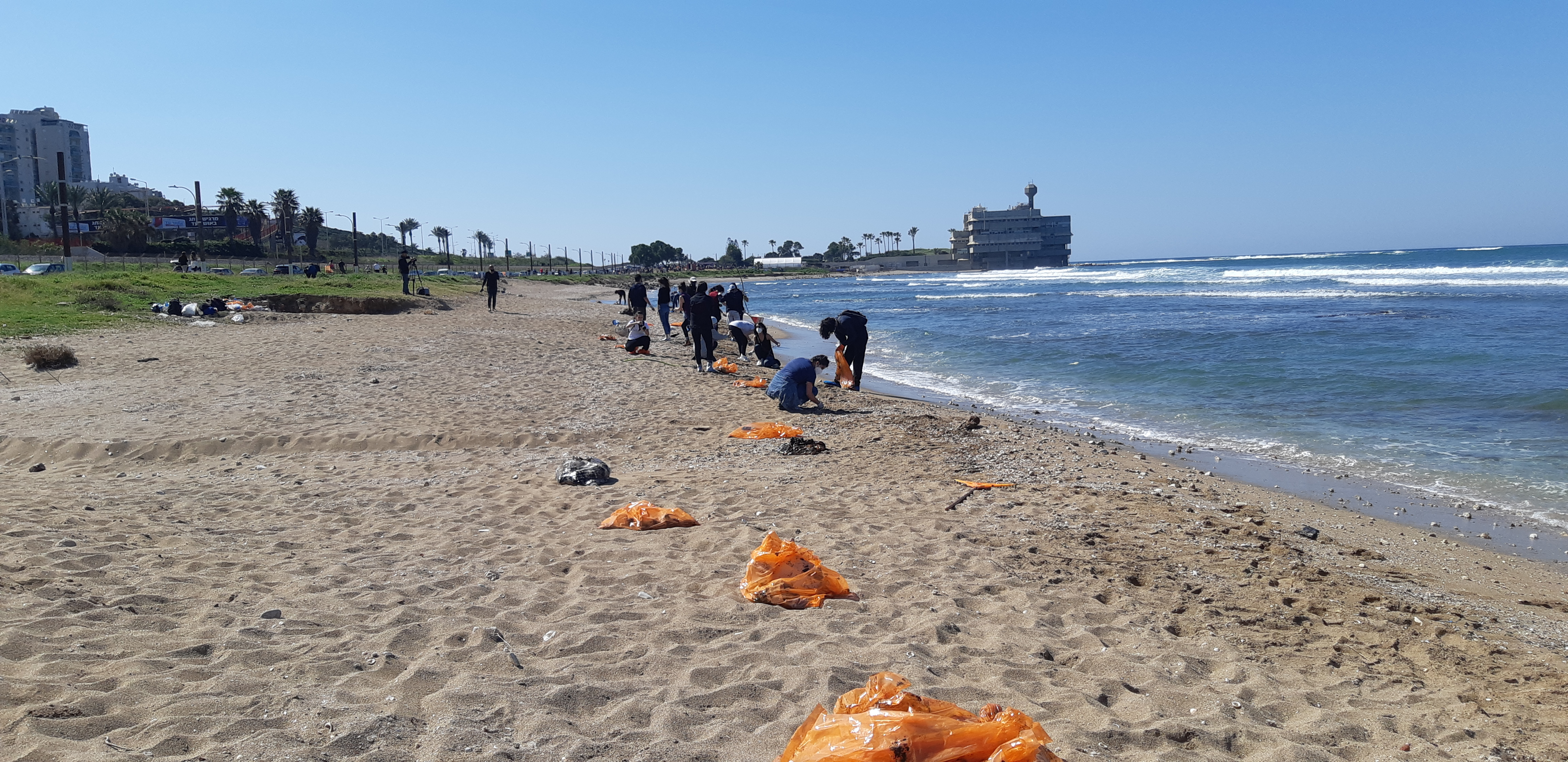
Tar cleaning by volunteers on the beach of Hubert Humphrey Street in Haifa, looking south towards the Israel Oceanographic and Limnological Research on Friday, February 26, 2021

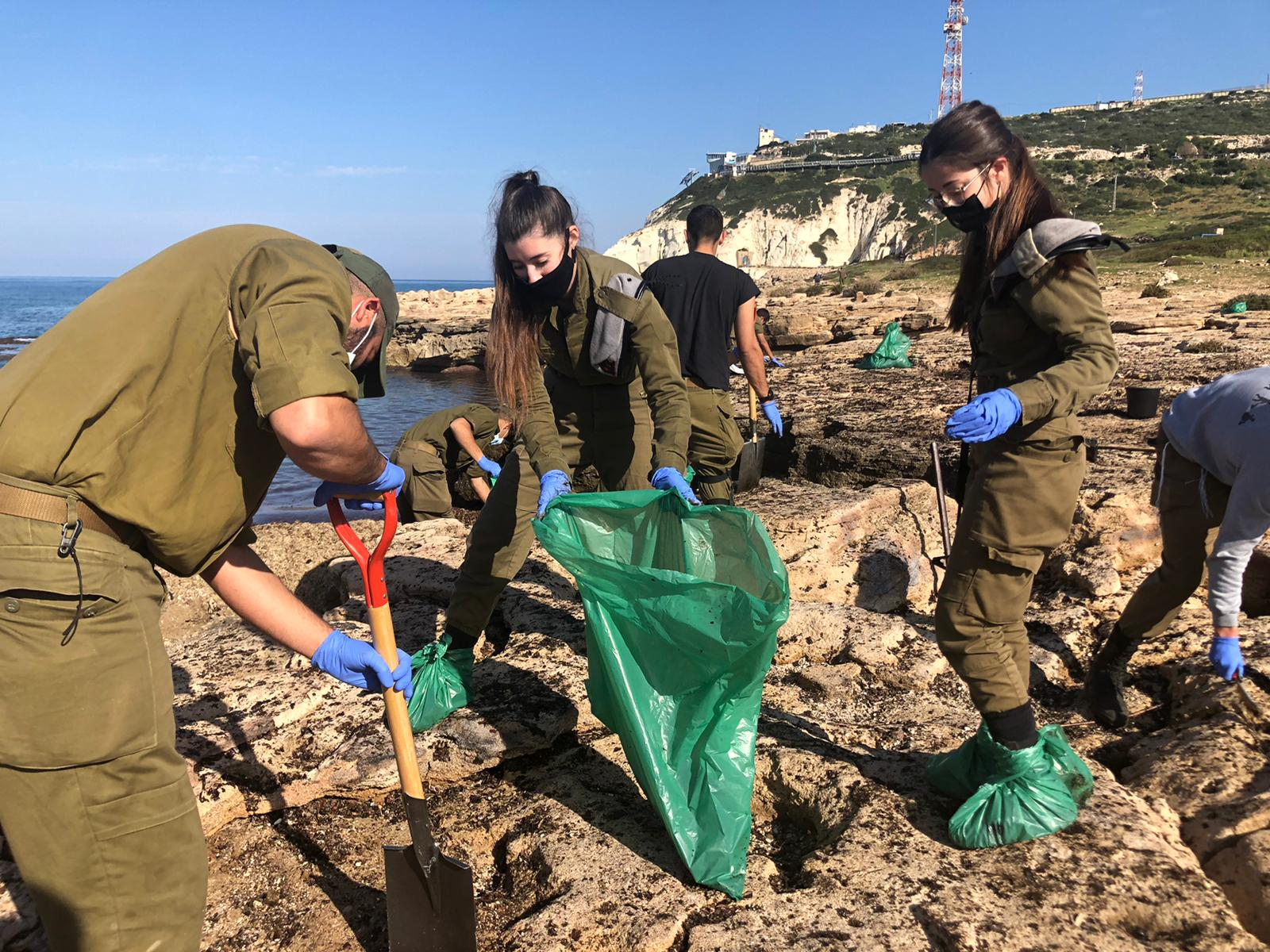
IDF soldiers help clean up the 2021 Israel oil spill in Rosh HaNikra, February 2021

The 2021 Mediterranean oil spill was an ecological disaster which occurred in February 2021 along the Mediterranean coast of Israel and Lebanon. Starting on 16 February 2021, dozens to hundreds of tons of tar washed up on the beaches along a 160-kilometre (99 mi) stretch of Israel's coast from Rosh Hanikra to Ashkelon, following a heavy storm and unusually high waves. Tar deposits also heavily impacted the beaches in south Lebanon. European Sentinel satellite photos showed 12 apparent oil slicks at various distances from the shore between 11 and 13 February 2021 according to Greenpeace.

== Government reaction ==
All of Israel's beaches were closed until further notice. The population was advised not to go swimming or to play sports on the beach, as exposure to tar could endanger health.

Israeli Prime Minister Benjamin Netanyahu visited the beach near the port city of Ashdod and announced that the Ministry of Environmental Protection would draw up a plan to clean the beaches. The Israeli military pledged to deploy several thousand soldiers to support more than 4000 EcoOcean volunteers, who had begun clearing the beaches of clumps of tar.

The Environmental Protection Ministry said that the pollution was due to tens to hundreds of tons of oil spilled from a ship or illegally dumped into the sea from a tanker and that they are working with European agencies to identify the ship responsible. Nine ships that would have been about 50 kilometers off Israel's coast on 11 February 2021 would be considered.

== Environment and health ==
Numerous sea animals such as fish, turtles and seabirds were found washed up and covered with a black, sticky film. The entire ecosystem of the coast may have been damaged for decades. Cleanup will take months to years, officials said, at the estimated cost of tens of millions of shekels. The Israel Nature and Parks Authority described the maritime pollution as the worst natural disaster in years.

The Tyre Coast Nature Reserve had approximately two tons of tar, much of which was hidden under the sand. The reserve is as an important nesting site for endangered loggerhead and green sea turtles. Many other damaged beaches in southern Lebanon are also important habitats for the turtles and other creatures. A young fin whale about 17-meter-long (56 ft) that washed up dead on a beach in the south of Israel, was found to have black liquid in its lungs. Numerous coral reefs on Israel's coast were covered with a layer of tar. According to the Israel Nature and Parks Authority, this endangers the existence of a rare sea snail that was recently rediscovered.

Several volunteers taking part in the massive clean-up operation complained of malaise after inhaling toxic fumes and were taken to hospitals.

== Investigations ==
According to the official Israeli investigation, the spilled oil originated from the tanker Emerald which was going from Iran to Syria. Black Cube private intelligence company said that the ship is owned by the Syrian Malah family via a complex structure of shell companies. The tanker was insured by the UAE-based Islamic P&I club, which “is solely used by Iranian ship owners that cannot find cover elsewhere” according to Lloyd’s List.

=== Gag order ===
At the request of the Environmental Protection Ministry, the Haifa Magistrates Court issued a gag order on 22 February: publications of the names of people or ships, ports, navigation routes or cargo that could lead to the identification of suspects were banned. The Israeli media described this as "irregular" while the environmental protection organization Adam Teva veDin warned of a loss of confidence in the government as a result of this measure. A representative from the environmental research center in Haifa accused the environmental ministry of failing to prevent such disasters and of a lack of transparency. The following day, the gag order was partially lifted, leaving only ongoing investigations under cover. On 3 March, Israeli environment minister Gila Gamliel said the oil had been spilled intentionally by a ship carrying it from Iran to Syria, calling it an act of eco-terrorism; however, her claims were disputed by security officials.

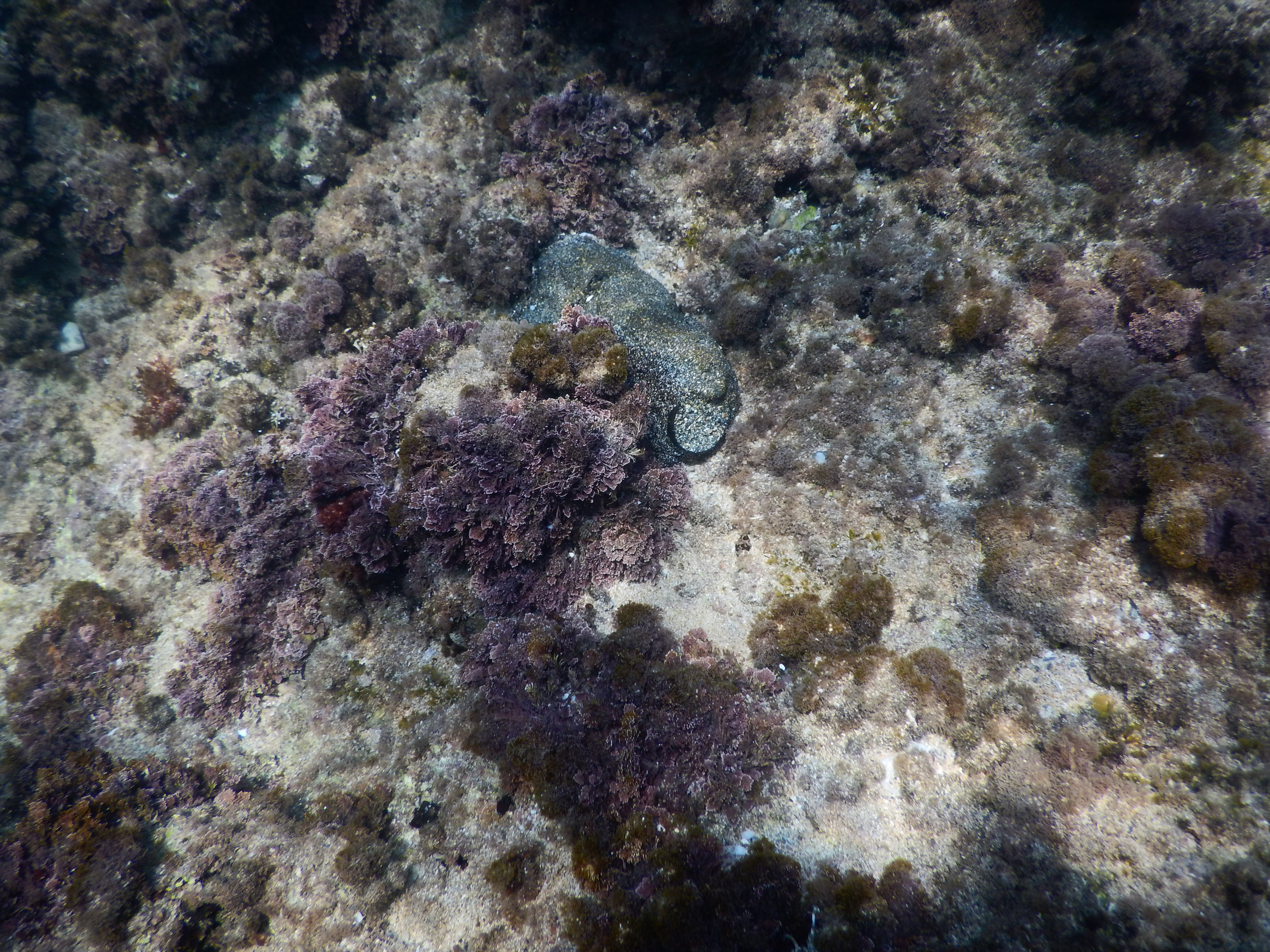
Lumps of tar camouflaged underwater in Rosh Hanikra

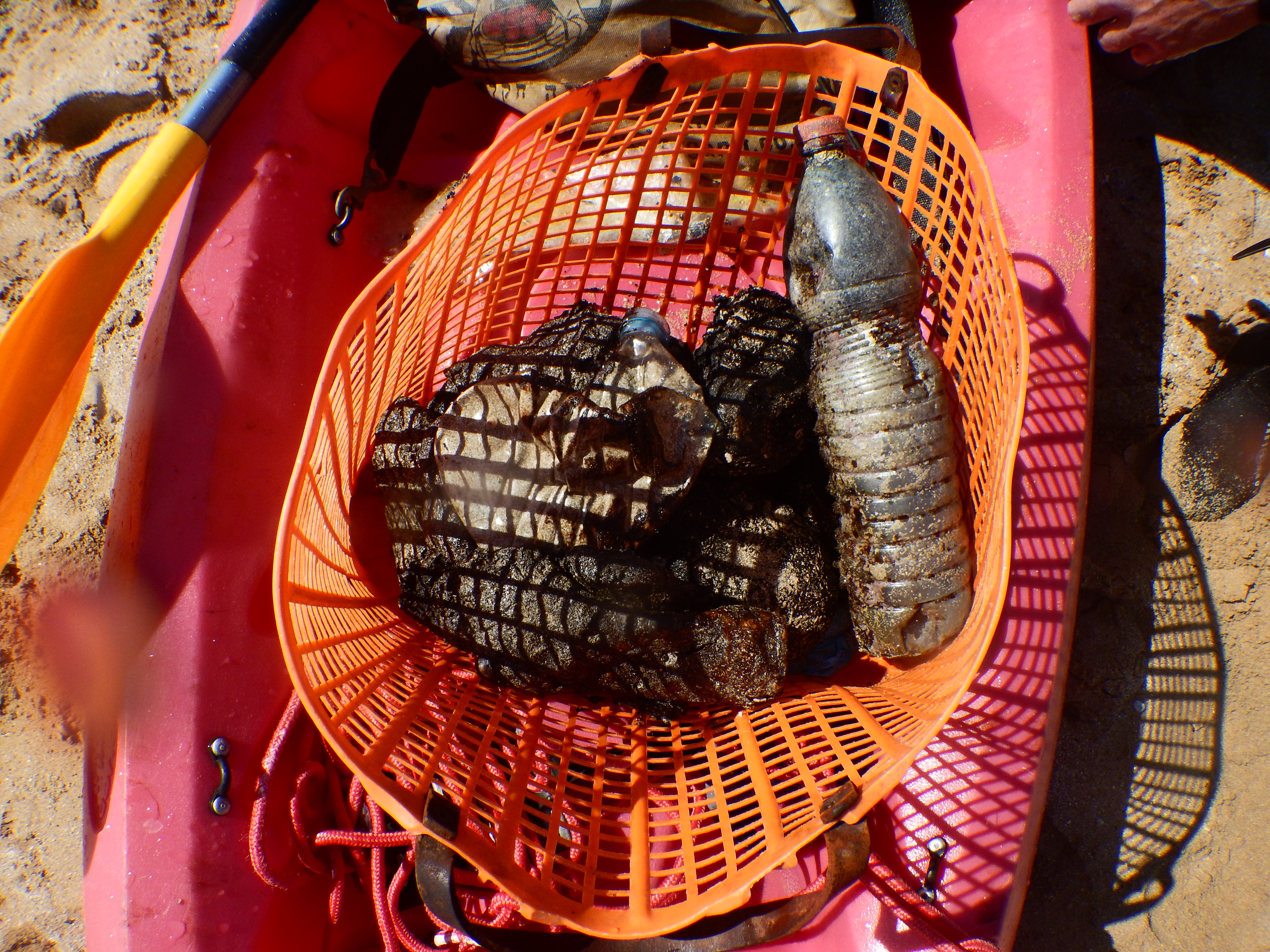
Tar that has accumulated in underwater debris in Rosh Hanikra

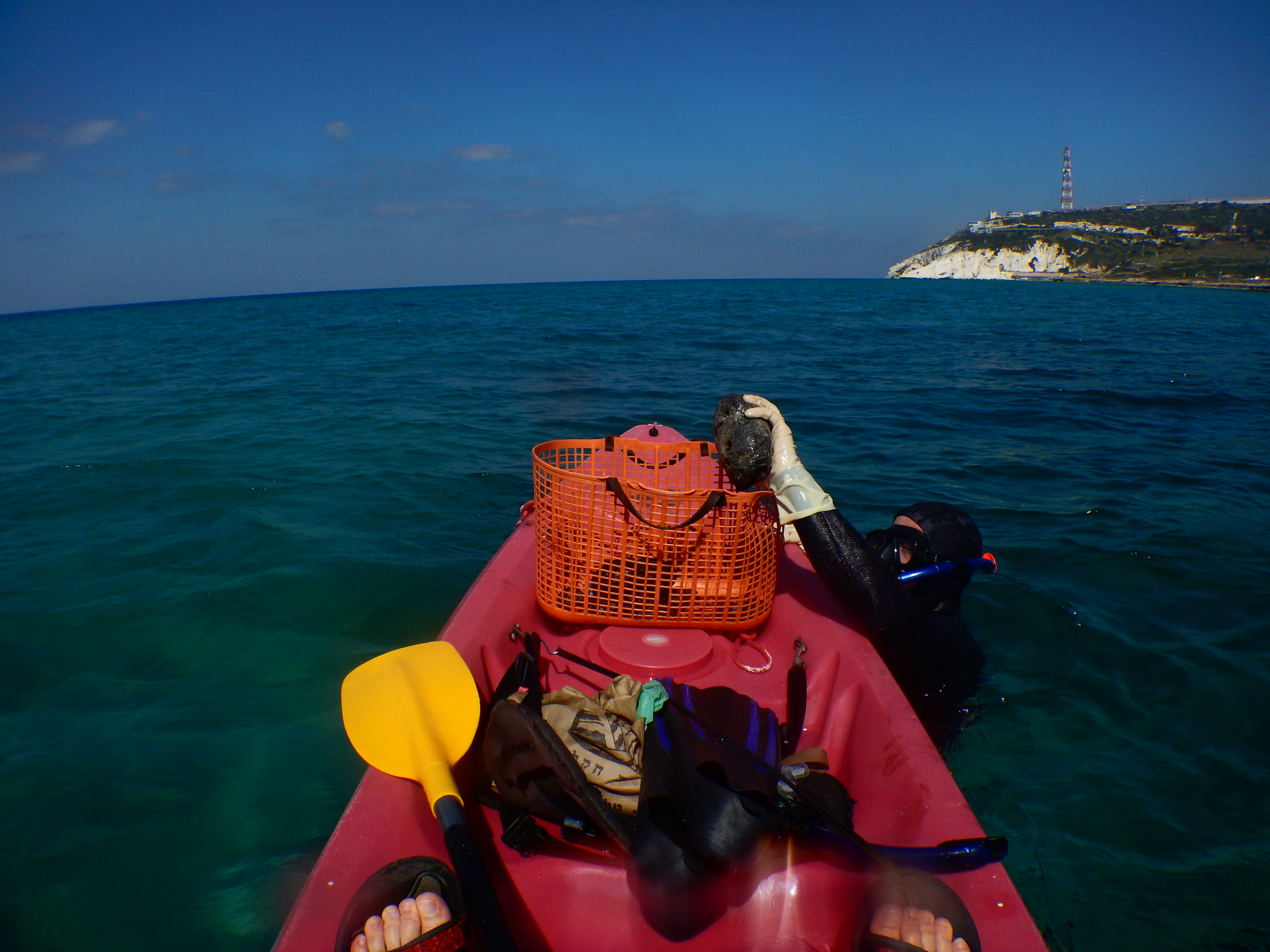
Private initiative of the residents of the area to collect the tar underwater, combining kayaking and diving in Rosh Hanikra

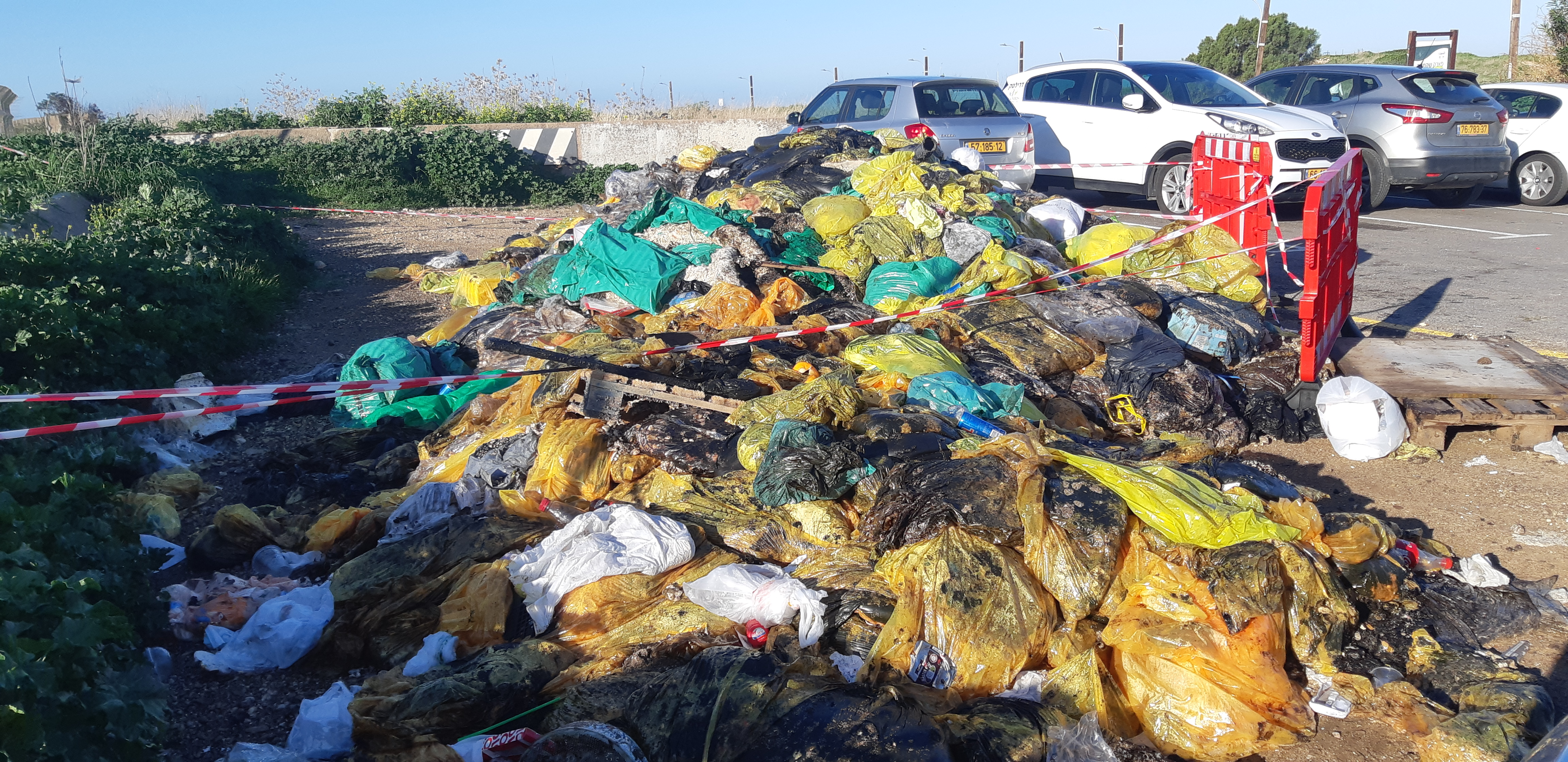
Bags with tar collected on the shores of Haifa in the area near Israel Oceanographic and Limnological Research
