= Camp Yehoshua =

Camp Yehoshua named after Haganah commander Yehoshua Globerman (1905-1947) may refer to:

- A former military base in HaKirya, Israel
- IDF recruit training base Batar Nitzanim within the Nitzanim Nature Reserve
