= Yehuda Stolov =

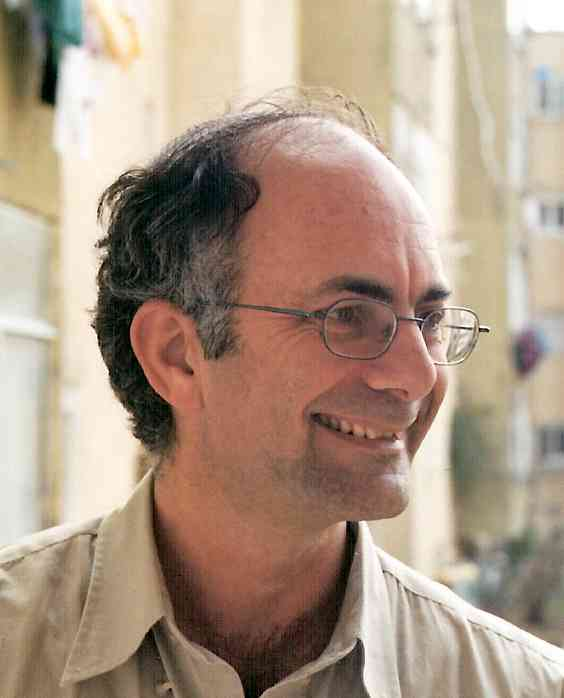
- Born: February 19, 1961 (age 65)
- Occupation: Executive Director of Interfaith Encounter Association
- Website: https://interfaith-encounter.org/en/whos-who/

Yehuda Stolov, an Israeli, is a founder and the executive director of the Interfaith Encounter Association (IEA). He currently resides in Jerusalem with his wife, Lia and his three kids.

== Education ==
Stolov’s education is very diverse. Before his college career, he studied several Jewish subjects at the yeshiva Mercaz HaRav Kook. He has a B.S. and an M.S. in physics from the Hebrew University in Jerusalem. He also has a multidisciplinary PhD with a dissertation entitled Development Templates in Rabbi Nachman of Braslav’s Stories - a Complex Dynamic Approach. On top of that, he has received training for NGO leadership.

== Interfaith experience ==
Along with his directorship at IEA, he also retained a membership with the Advisory Board of the Foundation for Interreligious Diplomacy, a status as founder of The Future Shapers Institute, a consultancy to the EUREPA Suisse SA and the Saint Nicholas Foundation. He also is a member of the Standing Committee of “The Trialogue of Cultures” of the Herbert Quandt Foundation. Yehuda was also awarded the 2006 Prize for Humanity by the Immortal Chaplains Foundation. As described, this award honors those who "risked all to protect others of a different faith or ethnic origin".

Previously, he held the following titles:
• Membership with the Steering Committee for the United Nations Decade of Interreligious Dialogue and Cooperation for Peace.

• Membership in the Council of Demiurgus Peace International.

• Regional Coordinator of the Middle East and North Africa Region of the United Religions Initiative (URI).

• Membership in the Interim and Global Council of the URI.

• Co-organizer of The Contemporary Challenges to the Abrahamic Religions.

• Membership in the Executive Committee/Board of The International Council of Christians and Jews (ICCJ).

• Organizer in the second annual conference and of the Middle East Abrahamic Forum (MEAF).

• Co-organizer of the foundation conference of the Middle East Abrahamic Forum (with Egyptian, Jordanian and Palestinian counterparts).

• General Secretary of The Israel Interfaith Association.

• Membership in the Young Leadership Committee of the ICCJ.

== Interviews ==
Justvision: http://www.justvision.org/en/profile/yehuda_stolov.php
Global Dialogue Center: http://www.globaldialoguecenter.com/events/stolov.shtml
Chicago Public Radio's Worldview: http://www.chicagopublicradio.org/content.aspx?audioID=32837
PRI's The World: http://www.theworld.org/?q=node/19326
Washington Jewish Week: https://web.archive.org/web/20110721012201/http://washingtonjewishweek.com/main.asp?Search=1&ArticleID=10351&SectionID=4&SubSectionID=&S=1

== Lectures in international conferences ==
• "The Relevance of Freedom of Religion and Belief to the Sustainable Development Goals", side event to the Human Rights Council session, panel debate, March 7, 2019, Geneva, Switzerland.

• "The Interfaith Encounter Association", in Symposium on the follow-up to the Rabat Plan of Action and Beirut Declaration on “Faith for Rights”, 6–7 December 2017, Rabat, Morocco.

• "The Interfaith Encounter Association", in "Building a Culture of Peace in the Middle East and the Global Arena", January 12, 2016, Knesset (Israeli Parliament), Jerusalem.

• "Holy Land Peace through Interfaith Encounter – Digital & Human Connections", in the 34th World Congress of the International Association for Religious Freedom, 24–27 August 2014, Birmingham, UK.

• "Peace in the Holy Land. It Can be Done.", keynote speech at the conference "Religious Freedom and Responsibility For Planet and People", organized by International Association for Religious Freedom and World Congress of Faiths, 20–23 August 2013, Horsham, UK.

• "Shift your paradigm! - A proven approach for achieving peace in the Holy Land", in Limmud Conference, December 21–27, 2012, University of Warwick, UK.

• "Qualities for Productive Encounters Based on the Teachings of Sfat Emet", in Limmud Conference, December 21–27, 2012, University of Warwick, UK

• "The Dotted Kiss in Parasht Vayishlach - The Power of Encounter", in Limmud Conference, December 21–27, 2012, University of Warwick, UK.

• "Jerusalem-Hebron Religious Leaders Forum", in Regional Conference International Association for Religious Freedom – Europe-Middle-East, July 19–22, 2012, Elspeet The Netherlands.

• "The Interfaith Encounter Association – Education to Civil Excellence", in: "Excellence in Education 2012: Theory-Research-Practice", July 9–12, 2012, Jerusalem Israel.

• "Interfaith Encounter Association", in: "Inter-religious and Inter-Cultural Dialogue in a Changing Middle East – Challenges and Opportunities", May 30, 2012, Western Galilee College, Akko Israel

• “Interfaith Encounter and Peaceful Coexistence in the Holy Land”, in: "Second Emory Conference on Religion, Conflict, and Peacebuilding", June 17–19, 2011, Emory University, Atlanta GA, USA

• "Religion as a Bridge" (in Hebrew), in: "Religious Faith and the Jewish-Arab Conflict", April 13–14, 2011, Haifa University, Haifa, Israel.

• "Interreligious Grassroots-work in Jerusalem", in: "Jerusalem – Holy to Jews, Christians and Muslims", April 1–3, 2011, Lassalle-House, Bad Schönbrunn, Switzerland.

• "Interfaith Dialogue for an Open Jerusalem", in "Jerusalem: The Global Challenge", first Annual International Conference, October 14–16, 2010, Jerusalem, Israel.

• Keynote address in the conference “Religious Narratives on Jerusalem and their Role in Peace Building”, organized by The German Development Service (DED), Wasatia, and the Konrad-Adenauer-Stiftung, Ramallah (KAS), 20 October 2009, Jerusalem, Israel.

• "Politics and Interfaith Encounter in the Holy Land", in: Euro-Mediterranean Meeting on Religious Diversity Management, 15–17 December 2008, Barcelona, Spain.

• "Religion as a Reform Mechanism", in: Religions and Reforms – International Conference Under the Patronage of HRH Prince El Hassan Bin Talal, 29–30 January 2007, Dead Sea, Jordan.

• "Interreligious Prevention and Mediation of Conflicts in Urban Areas – the Interfaith Encounter Association", in: "Congress on Religions and cultural Diversity: Mediation towards Social Cohesion", 18–20 December 2006, Barcelona, Spain.

• "RELIGION: NOT THE PROBLEM OF THE MIDDLE EAST BUT MAY BE A SOLUTION", in: "International Conference on Education for Peace & Democracy", 19–23 November 2006, Antalya, Turkey.

• in Sabanci University, Faculty of Arts and Social Sciences, Department of Conflict Analysis and Resolution; 20 November 2006, Istanbul, Turkey.

• "The Interfaith Encounter Approach", in "Making Visions come true" – the IX. Nuerenberger Forum, 26–29 September 2006, Nuerenberg, Germany.

• "The Role of Religion for World Peace and Sustainability - The Interfaith Encounter Approach", in: "International Forum on Religion and Peace", June 9–10, 2006, Seoul, Korea.

• "The Role of Religion for World Peace and Sustainability in the 21st Century", in: "2006 World Religious Leaders' Conference", June 8–14, 2006, Seoul, Korea.

• “Building Human Peace through Interfaith Dialogue” – in “Religion and State” and “Media” seminars at the School of Law in Tel Aviv University, 9 December 2003 and 5 January 2005.

• “Self-education for Peace Through Interfaith Dialogue”, in “Alternative peace Education in a Violent Conflict” – Annual conference of the peace Education Forum, The Truman Institute – the Hebrew university of Jerusalem, 21–22 October 2003.

• “The Human Globalization: A View from the Holy Land”, in “An inter-faith Perspective on Globalisation” – International Conference in the Summer School of Plater College, Oxford UK, July 2002.

• “What are Stories Made of? A Mechanical Analysis of Texts”, in the Thirteenth World Congress of Jewish Studies, Jerusalem, August 2001.

• “Plurality – a Jewish View”, in: “The Contemporary Challenges to the Abrahamic Religions”, conference on the Abrahamic Religions, Yogyakarta, Indonesia, August 2000.

• “The Struggle for Peace in Israel” in the 30th World Congress of the International Association for Religious Freedom (IARF), Vancouver, August 1999.

• Numerous lectures, in Israel and abroad, on the theory and practice of the work of the Interfaith Encounter Association.

== Publications ==
- "Faith & Interfaith", Goodness Times, July 2021
- "Building Peace – step by step, person by person", Faith Initiative Magazine, Issue 43, Spring 2021.
- "The Easy Way to Peace in the Holy Land", Goodness Times, June 2021
- "Overcoming Hatred through Faith – Lessons from the Holy Land", Faith Initiative Magazine, Issue 39, Spring 2019.
- "Yes to dialogue, even in tough times", Arutz Sheva, 27 December 2015
- "Peace in the Holy Land. It Can be Done.", in "Religious Freedom and Responsibility For Planet and People" Conference Book, Co-Editors: Richard F. Boeke and Patrick Wynne-Jones, p. 11-16, London 2013.
- "Interfaith Encounter Association: Harmony among Jews and Palestinians", in "The ABC of Harmony", Editor: Leo Semashko, p. 150-151, New Delhi 2012.
- "Parasjat Wajelech (Deuteronomium 31:1-20)" (translated from English into Dutch), in Nes Amim International Magazine, Num. 3, 2010.
- "Jewish Religious Narratives on Jerusalem and Their Role in Peace Building", in "Religious Narratives on Jerusalem and Their Role in Peace Building", p. 51-61, Proceedings of an interreligious conference held October 20, 2009 in Jerusalem, Editor: Konstanze von Gehlen.
- "Uns objectuis assolibles" (translated from English into Catalan), in"Religions I Objectius Del Millenni", p. 148-149, Centre UNESCO de Catalunya – UNESCOCAT, December 2009.
- "The Contribution of Interfaith Dialogue to the Resolution of Political Conflicts" (in Hebrew), In: Shtern, S. (Ed.) "Forum of Interfaith Dialogue Leaders", Bar Ilan University, Ramat Gan, 2009.
- "Construir la pau a Terra Santa", Dialogal – Quaderns de I'Associacio UNESCO per al Dialeg Interreligios, Tardor 2008 – Num. 27, Barcelona.
- "The Interfaith Encounter Approach to Peace Education in Israel", in: "Visionen wahr machen", proceedings of the 2006 Nurenberg Forum, Editor: Johannes Lahrmann, Hamburg-Schenefeid, Germany, 2007.
- "Interfaith in Action", in: "A Global Guide to Interfaith: Reflections from around the world", Editors: Sandy & Jael Bharat, O Books, Oxford, United Kingdom, May 2007.
- "Believe it can happen: the Interfaith Encounter approach to the Israeli-Palestinian conflict", In Kuriansky, J. (Ed.) "Beyond Bullets and Bombs: Grassroots Peacebuilding between Israelis and Palestinians", Westport, Connecticut: Praeger Press, August 2007.
- "Cross Religious Approaches Amidst the Conflicts", in "Religionen im Gesprach, Rig 9: Europe in the Orient – the Orient in Europe", Editors: Reinhard Kirste, Paul Schwarzenau & Udo Tworuschka, Balve, Germany, 2006.
- "The Role of Religion for World Peace and Sustainability - The Interfaith Encounter Approach", in: "World Peace and Religious Harmonization, Manhae Foundation, Seoul Korea, June 2006.
- "The Role of Religion for World Peace and Sustainability in the 21st Century", in: "Harmony-Peace-Sustainability – 2006 World Religious Leaders' Conference", Manhae Foundation, Seoul Korea, June 2006.
- "On Overcoming Anti-Semitism & Islamophobia", Palestine-Israel Journal, Vol 12 No. 2&3, 2005.
- "IEA and the Way to Peace", Weekly Blitz, Vol. 1 issue 15, Dhaka, Bangladesh, January 2006.
- "Interfaith Encounter in the Service of Peace", in: Peace, Literature, and Art, ed. Prof. Ada Aharoni, November 2005 in Encyclopedia of Life Support Systems (EOLSS), Developed under the Auspices of the UNESCO, Eolss Publishers, Oxford, UK
- "Building Human Peace through Interactive Interfaith Dialogue", Christians Aware, Winter 2005.
- “What are Stories Made of? A Mechanical Analysis of Texts”, Proceedings of the Thirteenth World Congress of Jewish Studies, Jerusalem, January 2003.
- “Plurality – a Jewish View”, in: “Commitment of Faiths: Identity, Plurality and Gender”, Institute of Dian/Interfidei, Yogyakarta, Indonesia 2002.
- “Dialogo Sulla Frontiera”, Confronti, 7/8 (2000) 14, Rome, Italy.
- “The Struggle for Peace in Israel”, in: “Creating an Earth Community: A Religious Imperative”, Proceedings of the 30th World Congress of the International Association for Religious Freedom, IARF (2000).
- “What Are Stories Made Of? - Quantitative Categorical Deconstruction of Creation”, International Journal of Modern Physics C, Vol. 11 No. 4 (2000) 827.
- “Being an Israeli”, Materialdienst, No. 2 (1998) 10.
