= Israel/Palestine Center for Research and Information =

Israeli/Palestinian NGO and public policy think tank

- Founded: 1988
- Founder: Gershon Baskin
- Type: Non-profit; NGO
- Location: Jerusalem
- Method: Think tank activity, Trans boundary partnerships, Regionalism, Public education
- Key people: Liel Maghen (Israeli Co-CEO); Nivine Sandouka (Palestinian Co-CEO); Gershon Baskin (Chairman of the Board of Directors)
- Website: www.ipcri.org

The Israel/Palestine Center for Research and Information (Hebrew: איפקרי; Arabic: ايبكري) is a joint Israeli/Palestinian NGO and public policy think tank based in Jerusalem working towards building partnerships in Israel/Palestine. Under shared Israeli-Palestinian leadership, IPCRI carries out research and projects in various fields from economic development to environmental sustainability. IPCRI also facilitates public outreach and track two negotiations between Israelis and Palestinians.

== Mission ==
The Israel/ Palestine Center for Research and Information is a joint institution of Israelis and Palestinians dedicated to a just, viable and sustainable resolution of the Israeli-Palestinian conflict on the basis of “two states for two peoples." Author Michelle I. Gawerc noted IPCRI importance as one of the only organizations to be active during the Second Intifada.

== History ==
In 1988, as a response to the first few months of the First Intifada, Gershon Baskin published an advertisement in three Palestinian newspapers inviting Palestinians who believed in a two-state solution to contact him. He met with 23 interested Palestinians and laid the foundation for IPCRI, which was known at the time as the Israel/Palestine Center for Research and Information. This organization operated as a public policy think tank in search of a two-state solution based on self-determination and security for both Palestinians and Israelis. Integral in the structure of the new organization was joint management by two directors—one Israeli, one Palestinian—as well as an equally divided board of directors. The fledgling organization worked for over a year to garner support and partnership from prominent Israeli and Palestinian politicians to ensure its survival and effectiveness. A Palestinian co-director, Zakaria al Qaq was appointed in accordance with the declared policy of IPCRI of sharing management of the organization between Israelis and Palestinians.

After this phase, IPCRI began its work by establishing working groups on business and economics, water, and the issue of Jerusalem. Participants included officials from both communities, economists, scientists, NGO representatives and journalists. Reports arising from these meetings played an important role in informing key Israeli and Palestinian deliberations and negotiations over the years.

In response to the favorable atmosphere created by the Oslo I Accord, IPCRI expanded its activities and became involved in peace education, putting forward proposals for the creation of legal frameworks dealing with investment and other economic issues, and environmental concerns. IPCRI sought both to provide a safe environment in which Israelis and Palestinians could share their concerns and influence public policy.

The coming of the Second Intifada in 2000 made the work of IPCRI more difficult but activity continued in almost all of the areas of concern mentioned above. IPCRI developed wide-ranging contacts within Israeli and Palestinian society and continued to attract funding from the international community. After more than a decade of standstill, IPCRI decided to focus In developing trans boundary partnerships and "Out of the Box" initiatives. Accordingly, in 2013 the organization announced its new name in order for supporting Creative Regional Initiatives for confronting the conflict.

IPCRI founder Gershon Baskin served as the Israeli Co-CEO of IPCRI from its establishment in 1988 through the end of 2011. The Palestinian Co-CEOs were Zakaria al Qaq, Khaled Duzdar, and Hanna Siniora. Since 2012, IPCRI was co-managed by Israeli Dan Goldenblatt and Palestinian Riman Barakat from their offices in Jerusalem. Since January 2016, Liel Maghen and Nivine Sandouka serve as the co-directors of the organization.

== Areas of Work ==
=== Environment ===
The Environment and Water Department at IPCRI was established in 1994. It has as its objective the promotion of effective cooperation between Israelis and Palestinians regarding the environmental future of the region. Over the years it has been concerned, among other issues, with conflicts over water and the promotion of low cost sanitation projects, the introduction of solar energy into the region, the vexed question of the treatment of hazardous waste, the study of air pollution and the long-term impact of climate change. Earlier initiatives included the training of Israelis and Palestinians in the specialized field of environmental mediation. The program has been financed largely by the international community. Donors have included United States Agency for International Development, the European Union, the Canadian aid agency International Development Research Centre, as well as a variety of national governments. Over the years several thousand Israelis and Palestinians have taken part in the program together with many diverse international experts.

==== GLOWA ====
IPCRI has been an active partner in the “GLOWA Jordan River Project”. This is an international study of the future of the water scarce Jordan River Basin financed by the German Ministry of Education and Research. Research teams from Israel, Jordan, the Palestinian Authority, and Germany took part. The project began a decade ago and IPCRI joined it in 2006. Its role was to promote genuine cooperation among the partners and to help prepare alternative scenarios as to what response to the impact of climate change should be in different political and economic circumstances

==== Water Conferences ====
In 2004 IPCRI organized a major conference on water issues in the Middle East which was attended by over 200 Palestinian, Israeli, Jordanian, Turkish and various international experts and officials and held in Antalya, Turkey. The published results of the conference have become a standard text for those working on water issues in the region and the inter-personal relationships developed both at this conference and at other IPCRI seminars on water distribution and quality, have done much to promote effective dialogue between the two communities. The papers presented were published by Springer Verlag, in Germany in 2006. IPCRI undertook work on providing low cost sanitation to Palestinian villages in the West Bank with the support of the Japanese Government in 2009.

=== Political Think Tank and Track II Negotiations ===
==== Strategic Thinking and Analysis Team (STAT) ====
Every month a team of Palestinian and Israeli academic, political, and economic leaders come together for a think tank session about a specific aspect of the advancement of a just and sustainable solution to the Israeli-Palestinian conflict. Subsequently, IPCRI publishes policy papers with the meetings' findings. Recently, experts have engaged in conversation on such topics as normalization, the status quo in the peace process, and collective rights in Israel and Palestine. From these discussions, the experts produce policy papers with their reflections and recommendations addressing the issues. These meetings are supported by the German foundation Konrad Adenauer Stiftung.

==== Release of Gilad Shalit ====
On 25 June 2006 Gilad Shalit, an Israeli IDF Soldier, was abducted by Hamas. Gershon Baskin had met a professor of the Islamic University of Gaza at a conference in Cairo. Through him he was able to establish contact with a Hamas operative, and then with Ghazi Hamad, Hamas's deputy Foreign minister. Baskin offered the Olmert government help to negotiate a deal for the release of Gilad Shalit but was rejected. After David Meidan became the new representative in the negotiations to release Gilad Shalit under the Netanyahu government in April 2011, Baskin renewed his offer. Meidan rejected his offer for five years before agreeing. Baskin was able to establish a communication line through which he was able to negotiate with Ahmed Jabari, operational leader of Hamas's military wing, and high on the list of terrorists wanted by Israel.

=== Peace Building ===
==== Peace Education Program ====
From 1994 to 2005, IPCRI established a Peace Education curriculum to be taught to 10th graders in Israeli, Palestinian, and Jordanian schools. The original Peace Education curriculum was implemented in 32 schools, involving 3,000 students and 200 teachers—eventually the program grew to be implemented in 70 schools around the country.

The project was developed jointly by Israelis and Palestinians and drew on subjects already taught in classrooms, such as sociology, history, and literature. IPCRI project coordinators collaborated with the Israeli Ministry of Education in an attempt to expand the program. IPCRI endeavored to implement this program in order to equip high school students, mature enough to deal with the difficult subject matter, with conflict resolution skills and the values of peace, respect, and human rights. The project also included a sophisticated training program for the Peace Education instructors, which qualified the teachers to coach students in conflict resolution and also allowed for teachers from each side of the conflict to meet and interact.

In 2005, IPCRI was forced to discontinue the program due to budgetary restrictions, despite its success in bringing students and teachers from Israel and Palestine together, even during the Intifada.

==== Israeli and Palestinian Women for Change ====
This project, which spanned from May to December 2011, aimed to engage and empower Israeli and Palestinian women. It is supported by the Middle East Partnership Initiative. Mixed groups from across Israel and the West Bank came together first in small discussion groups to create a foundation of familiarity. The beginning of the project aimed to increase the women's self-confidence and organizational skills. The participants were also encouraged to find common ground by discussing such transcendent women's issues as childcare and pregnancy.

In its second stage, Women for Change Now brought participants together for a weekend-long conference. Participants in this conference addressed Israeli-Palestinian conflict issues more directly by requiring groups of women to create their own peace-building projects and to collaborate to implement these initiatives.

The projects created include a Hebrew-Arabic language workshop, a handicraft cooperative, a youth engagement initiative, and a cultural festival, among others.

==== Visit Israel/Palestine ====
IPCRI runs tours for Israelis and Palestinians in various cities across Israel and Palestine. IPCRI facilitates an exchange of information by obtaining travel permits for participants where travel is largely restricted. These trips have toured such destinations as Bethlehem and Jericho with the goal of breaking down physical and mental barriers, removing suspicion and fear of the other, and building up trust and support for a political peace process.

==== Partners for Change ====
IPCRI is bringing together 300 Jewish and Arab youths from Lod, Ramle and Tel Aviv-Jaffa (mixed Arab/Jewish cities). These young people work together to improve their cities after a process of reflection on their separate identities and the unique situation within their cities. They learn to understand the experiences and circumstances of the other side and subsequently collaborate to develop a hands-on community development project.

The project aims to foster a sense of "shared citizenship, justice and equality". Through the development of a participatory community improvement program, the youth work together across the Israeli and Arab communities. Partners for Change is supported by the United States Agency for International Development.

==== Research of Israeli and Palestinian Textbooks ====
In 2004, the United States Consulate in Jerusalem commissioned IPCRI to investigate textbooks in Israeli and Palestinian schools to examine whether they are of a tolerant, peaceful nature or a belligerent and discriminatory towards the other side.

According to IPCRI's published reports, Palestinian textbooks have improved greatly in recent years but some notable gaps and problems still exist. IPCRI reports an overriding nationalist theme in Palestinian textbooks, fostering pride and commitment to the Palestinian cause and cultural identity. As a corollary, some of the material "could be viewed by others (e.g., the Israelis) as promoting incitement and contempt". The textbooks often leave out historical events with great importance to Israel, such as the Oslo Accords, and references in any context to the State of Israel are minimal. The textbooks do feature peace educational materials, but not as they are applied to the Israeli-Palestinian conflict. The name 'Israel' does not appear on any maps in the textbooks, according to the report, and the textbooks are disapproving of Israeli policies like demolitions and occupations, and of Zionism as a whole.

IPCRI reported that in the Israeli textbooks, information is presented in a Zionist framework, but acknowledge prospects for peace with others who inhabit the land. IPCRI researchers publicized that references to Arabs are minimal; those that do exist are sometimes stereotypical and negative. Some Israeli textbooks also teach that Arabs left their land willingly or sold it to the Jews on the eve of Israeli independence.

The IPCRI reports were instrumental in refuting the claim that Palestinian textbooks "incite hatred or violence towards Israel and the Jews...or Western values". According to The Economist, the Israeli Minister of Education, three years after the reports of the release, urging Israeli schoolbooks to include more accurate maps and "enforcing" obligatory Arabic language education for elementary school students.

This study has also been covered in the Wikipedia page Textbooks in the Palestinian territories.

== Awards ==
- 1996 IPCRI Founder and Co-CEO Gershon Baskin named winner of Annual Histadrut Award for Peace and Coexistence
- 2004 Turkish Foreign Policy Institute's International Relations Prize for Peace
- 2004 World Movement for Democracy- Democracy and Peace Tribute of Courage; Durban, South Africa
- 2005 Eliav-Sartawi Prize for Middle East Journalism, Search for Common Ground
- 2005 NIRA's World Directory of Think Tanks
- 2007 IPCRI Co-CEOs Gershon Baskin and Hanna Siniora ordained Cavaliere della Ordine della Stella Solidarieta Italiana by the 2004 Italian Republic and the Italian president for peace making
- 2011 #25 Think Tank with the Most Innovative Policy Ideas/Proposals, Global Go-To Think Tank Rankings, University of Pennsylvania Think Tanks and Civil Societies Program (TTCSP)
