= Holly Morris (author) =

American author and television producer (born 1965)

- Born: Holly Marie Morris; 30 September 1965 (age 61); Chicago, Illinois, U.S.
- Occupations: Writer, film and TV director/producer, travel documentary host,
- Notable credit: Globe Trekker
- Parents: Johnny Morris (father); Jeannie Morris (mother)
- Website: hollymorris.com

Holly Morris (born September 30, 1965) is an American author, documentary director/producer and television presenter. Her articles have been published in The New York Times Book Review, More, O, Slate, The Daily Telegraph, The Week and other national publications.

== Early life ==
Morris was born in Chicago, Illinois, US. She is the daughter of former professional football player Johnny Morris and Jeannie Morris, a sports reporter and writer. Johnny Morris was a Chicago Bears wide receiver who became a long-time sportscaster for WBBM-TV in Chicago and a football color commentator with CBS Sports. Jeannie Morris is the author of the best-selling book Brian Piccolo: A Short Season, the story of an American National Football League player who died of cancer at the age of 26.

== Career ==
Author

She is the author of Adventure Divas: Searching the Globe for a New Kind of Heroine (Random House), a New York Times Editor's Choice, and contributes to many publications, including “O,” The New York Times, The Week and The Independent. Her story about a subculture of illegal ‘Stalkers’ inside the Chernobyl's Dead Zone appeared in SLATE.

In 2010, her article "A Country of Women" was published.

Creative activist

Morris is the former editorial director of the book publishing company Seal Press, where she edited the Adventura series – ground breaking books about women explorers, travelers, and environmental issues. As an editorial director, she acquired and edited fiction and non-fiction on diverse topics including third wave feminism, health, international politics, and travel.

Executive Director

Morris is now executive director of Tomorrow's Women, a nonprofit that trains and supports Palestinian, American, and Israeli women in leadership and peacemaking skills.

== Personal life ==
Morris lives in Brooklyn, New York, and Santa Fe, NM, with her partner Michael Kovnat and their daughter.

== Works ==
As director/producer

- Exposure
- The Babushkas of Chernobyl
- Adventure Divas - 8 episodes, PBS

As travel host

- Globe Trekker
- Outdoor Investigations
- Treks in a Wild World
- Adventure Divas
- Gringo Trails

As author

- Adventure Divas: Searching the Globe for a New Kind of Heroine (2005, 2006)
- Best Travel Writing: 2013 (2013)
- Best Women's Travel Literature (2013)
- Go Your Own Way (2007)
- 100 Places Every Woman Should Go (2007)
- Cuba in Mind (2004)
- Homefield: 9 Writers at Bat (2004)
- A Woman Alone (2001)
- Gifts of the Wild (1998)
- Two in the Wild (1998)
- Another Wilderness (1993)
- Reading the Water (1993)

As editor

- Uncommon Waters: Women Write About Fishing (1991)
- A Different Angle: Fly Fishing Stories by Women (1995, 1996)

As Documentary Subject

- Hedgebrook: Women Authoring Change (2014)
