= Circle of Health International =

US-based non-governmental organization

- Founded: 2004
Founder	Sera Bonds
Type	Non-governmental organization
Focus	Maternal and neonatal health
Location	United States
Areas Served	Sri Lanka, Tibet, New Orleans, Sudan, Tanzania, Afghanistan, Israel, Haiti, Syria, Texas, Oklahoma, Jordan, Philippines, Nicaragua, Nepal, Sierra Leone, Turkey
Method	Providing quality healthcare to communities by partnering with local organizations
Website	cohintl.org

Circle of Health International (COHI) is a US-based non-governmental organization founded in 2004, with the mission to work with vulnerable women, children, and refugees during times of disaster through comprehensive women's health worldwide. They cooperate with organizations to help vulnerable women with a community-based approach during times of crisis. COHI has worked with midwives and public health professionals in countries like the United States, Sri Lanka, Louisiana, Tibet, Tanzania, Israel, the Philippines, Palestine, Jordan, Syria, Nicaragua, Sudan, Haiti, Afghanistan, and many more.

In response to humanitarian crises and natural disasters, COHI collaborates with local women leaders, midwives, and community-based organizations to deliver maternal and newborn healthcare, medical supplies, and reproductive health services.

== Activities ==
In 2016, COHI partnered with the American Refugee Committee to provide maternal and child healthcare in Haiti, midwives in Indigenous women's forum in Nicaragua, midwifery students and sexual health advocates in Nepal, a clinic for refugees in Rio Grand Valley on the Mexico/US border. COHI assists with human trafficking globally.

== Affiliation ==
COHI is affiliated with organizations including Catholic Charities, Boston University, Harvard, The American Refugee Committee, and the American Israel Political Action Committee AIPAC. COHI is also engaged in the social enterprise community program, known as the COHI Cloth Network, to address women's poverty.

== Missions ==
Tibet

In 2004, COHI partnered with a local host organization, Tibetan Healing Fund, in Tongren, also known as Repkong, Eastern Tibet to aid with the training of midwives to create a more sustainable maternal health care system.

Israel/West Bank

In 2004, COHI and their partners worked with Israeli and Palestinian women to address midwifery and Gender Based Violence (GBV). Conducted an assessment based on three main categories.

- To produce a substantial GBV ethnography of the region;
- To design and implement specialized programming targeting the cultural nuances of each group; and
- Coalition-building among Israeli and Palestinian organizations to implement relevant projects in partnership with local women's rights organizations.

The assessment included in-depth interviews and recommendations for each sector of Israel and the West Bank's diverse populations: religious and secular Jews, immigrant populations (Ethiopian, Russian, Congolese), the Bedouin, and the Palestinian populations of Israel and the West Bank, both Muslim and Christian The results from the assessment were used to advocate for the needs of Israeli and Palestinian women such as better postpartum care.

== Funding ==
COHI is a member of the Alliance for Middle East Peace, which requested $38 million in grant funding from the US House of Representatives under Title VIII (Program of Research and Training for Eastern Europe and the Independent State of the Former Soviet Union) in 2013. Such funding was made available after the fall of the Soviet Union as it recovered from communist societies. COHI also received the Positive Action Challenge Grant from the United Nations in 2016. Their services included providing health kits to refugees in Greece and Syrian midwife training in the Gaziantep and Turkey.
