= Jeannie Morris =

American sports journalist and author (1935–2020)

- Born: Jeannie Myers; December 2, 1935; Redondo Beach, California, U.S.
- Died: December 14, 2020 (aged 85); Chicago, Illinois, U.S.
- Occupation(s): Sports journalist, author
- Known for: Gender-equality reporting
- Spouse: Johnny Morris (m. 1960; div. 1985)
- Children: 4, including Holly

Jeannie Morris (née Myers; December 2, 1935 – December 14, 2020) was an American sports journalist and author. Primarily based in Chicago, she covered various sports, including baseball and football, during a time in which women were not permitted in certain areas of sporting events. As an author, she wrote biographies on Brian Piccolo and Carol Moseley Braun, the latter of whom she followed as a reporter.

Morris was the first American woman to cover many areas of sports at a time when they had been exclusively reported on by men. The first woman to cover sports in any major American daily newspaper, her early byline in 1968 was required to be, "Mrs. Johnny Morris". Noted as the first woman to broadcast live from the Super Bowl in 1975, she won several television Emmy Awards for local reporting and in 2014 was the first woman to receive the Ring Lardner Award for excellence in sports reporting.

== Biography ==
She was born Alice Jean Myers on December 2, 1935, in Redondo Beach, California. As a teenager, Jeannie Myers was a high school cheerleader in Redondo Beach, California. She went on to attend college at the University of California, Santa Barbara, where she met Johnny Morris, who played football there. He was drafted in 1958 by the Chicago Bears. They married in 1960; and she remained in California, during his early years with the Bears, until she moved to Chicago in 1963.

=== Career ===
Her sports journalism career began in 1968, as Johnny's football career was ending. The Chicago American newspaper had asked him to write a regular column about football; he, already working for WBBM-TV, suggested his wife write it. However, rather than being published in the sports section, the newspaper put her early contributions in the women's Sunday section, with the byline of "Mrs. Johnny Morris". Her work was gradually moved to the sports section and, later, featured in the Chicago Daily News, where she also had the freedom to write about other sports. One such feature was on how women weren't allowed in the pit area at the 1970 Indianapolis 500 trials. She bore all credentials, except she "wasn't a man".

In 1970, husband Johnny began a sportscaster job with WMAQ. She joined him in on-air radio broadcasts, covering the Chicago Bears. However, she was prohibited from being in the press box, and, in one instance, she sat outside on top of it, during a cold game with the Minnesota Vikings.

Also in 1970, she collaborated on her first book, a biography, with Bears' running back Brian Piccolo, documenting his battle with cancer. She convinced Piccolo, in part, to share his story, because his friend and teammate Gale Sayers, was writing an autobiography. Her book, titled Brian Piccolo: A Short Season (ISBN 1-5662-5024-2), was published in 1971.

In 1973, the Morrises embarked on a year-long camping trip to Europe and Russia; she chronicled the trip in her second book, Adventures in the Blue Beast (ISBN 0-5288-1016-2). After covering Super Bowl IX in 1975, which Morris later said "they had me talk to the [football] wives", both Morrises returned to work at WBBM. In 1983, they separated and divorced two years later, yet still worked together, including on a Bears pre-game show with then-head coach Mike Ditka.

Morris interviewed sports legends, such as Chris Evert, Joe Namath, Fran Tarkenton, Don Meredith, and Wilt Chamberlain. She left WBBM in 1990, yet worked on specials and documentaries and earning 11 Emmy Awards. She helped produce a PBS expedition series with her daughter, Holly. In 2015, she wrote her third book, Behind the Smile: A Story of Carol Moseley Braun's Historic Senate Campaign (ISBN 1-5728-4176-1), documenting Carol Moseley Braun's successful run for the United States Senate.

=== Death ===
On December 14, 2020, two weeks after her 85th birthday, Morris died in Chicago, where she was being treated for appendix cancer. She is survived by her four children.
