= Nivine Sandouka =

Palestinian feminist and peace activist

- Born: October 15, 1982 (age 43)
- Education: Birzeit University

Nivine Sandouka (Arabic: نيفين صندوقة; born October 15, 1982) is a Palestinian feminist and peace activist from East Jerusalem. She is currently the Regional Director of the Alliance for Middle East Peace .

== Early life and education ==
Sandouka was raised in the Shuafat neighborhood of East Jerusalem. She is a GCSE graduate from Schmidt's Girls College in Jerusalem.

Sandouka attended Birzeit University, where she earned a master's degree in democracy and human rights. She also carries a degree in Science from Bethlehem University.

== Career and activism ==
In 2014, Sandouka was a participant in the United States' International Visitor Leadership Program, on the theme of conflict resolution.

After she graduated from Bethlehem University, Sandouka started working at Oxfam GB in Jerusalem, and later worked at CARE international in the West Bank and Gaza. Later in 2015, became the Co Director of IPCRI, and also attended the United Nations-run 2021 and 2022 Conference on the Question of Jerusalem, where she was a panel speaker. She also participated as a speaker in several other conferences and events including J Street's annual conference.

On October 27, 2023, Sandouka appeared on France 24's The 51%.

Sandouka has also worked with the German Association for Development Cooperation,.

Sandouka runs "Judi- from me to you", a grassroots initiative that aims to connect women, is a board member of The Jerusalem Center for Women and Forward Global Women, is a member of the International Reference Group for the World Council of Churches, and is the executive director of the Jerusalem-based NGO, Our Rights.

== Personal life ==
Sandouka has a son.

== See also ==
- Rula Hassanein
