= Center for Israel Studies (Jordan) =

Think tank

- Founded: 2014
- Founder: Dr Abdullah Swalha
- Type: Not-for-profit, non-governmental organization, think tank
- Location: Amman, Kingdom of Jordan

The Center for Israel Studies in Jordan (CIS, Arabic: مركز للدراسات الإسرائيلية) is an independent, non-profit Jordan-based Arab think tank. Established in Amman in 2014, it is dedicated to the study of Israeli politics and society. It provides a platform for scholars from all around the world to present papers and exchange opinions regarding Israel, its regional relationships and its position in the world. The center conducts policy studies and strategic analyses of political, economic and security issues throughout the greater Middle East, with a specific focus on issues concerning Arab–Israeli conflict, Israel's public policy, and the advancement of peace among the Jews and Arabs in the region. The Center for Israel studies is not affiliated with any political parties or governments. In 2015, CIS-Jordan became a member of the Alliance for Middle East Peace.

== About the organization ==
Founded in 2014, CIS is the only Arab NGO that conducts research on Israeli affairs. CIS works to build a multifaceted field of Israel studies in Jordan and to expand the opportunities for a deeper understanding of Israel in all Arab states. Driven by the importance of disseminating a more complete understanding of Israel, CIS conducts lectures, trainings, consultations, conferences, and workshops.

== Activities ==
CIS pursues its objectives through a range of activities:

- Daily expert news summaries and analysis regarding events in Israel and the region through online publications written in Arabic
- Analysts, journalists and politicians from the region visit Jordan to share their insights with their Jordanian counterparts
- Academic seminars between the two countries
- Translation of important books and articles from Hebrew into Arabic
- Holding regional conferences about Israeli affairs in the Middle East
- Connecting Arab scholars who work in the field of Israel studies
- Hebrew language workshops in Arab nations
- Establishing a YouTube channel "Ask Me," where Arabs ask questions about Israel and Israelis answer them
- Dialogue with Jordanian opinion formers and the media on issues of importance to the Jordan-Israel relationship
- Strategy analysis and recommendations to the Jordanian government — both to shape foreign policy vis-à-vis Israel, and to widen Jordan's involvement in a binding rapprochement between Israel and the Palestinian Authority
- Conducting surveys in Jordan and the greater Arab world about Israel

== Collaboration with other institutions ==
In order to foster genuine and mutually beneficial cooperation, CIS Jordan collaborates with institutions such as the Institute for National Security Studies (Israel), the Moshe Dayan Center, the Western Galilee College, and the Israeli Institute for Regional Foreign Policy also known as Mitvim, the Bar-Ilan University, the American Jewish Committee, and the University of Jordan.

== In the news ==
The Times of Israel wrote that the Center for Israel Studies in Jordan "seeks to combat media misinformation surrounding the Jewish state and the Israeli-Palestinian conflict by presenting an alternative, neutrality-driven view of Israel in Arabic for Jordan's decision makers, journalists and wider public."

Haaretz in an interview with former Israeli ambassador to Jordan, Oded Eran said, "I really admire their courage because it is not easy in an Arab country to speak objectively about Israel."

In an interview with The Jerusalem Post, Dr Swalha is quoted saying that "during the Arab Spring Arabs focused on domestic issues and that in the past, Arabs hung all their problems on Israel, but now they discovered it is not the main issue."

Avi Lewis in an interview with Mosaic Magazine, said that "Dr. Abdullah Swalha wants to see an informed Arab public equipped with the tools to relate, deal, and negotiate with Israel, by presenting the country as an imperfect democracy and model of tolerance, albeit with inequalities between Arab and Jewish citizens and an occupying power still controlling the lives of millions of Palestinians in the West Bank—a far cry from the "Zionist entity" trope widely used for decades in the Arab world as a blanket description for the Jewish state."

Assabeel, an Arabic weekly newspaper in Amman, Jordan, wrote that "Abdullah Swalha does not seek to beautify the image of Israel in the Arab world." Here, Sawalha discusses his meeting with former Israeli president Shimon Peres in the city of Petra and states that, the CIS “believes a lot of important information about the Israeli society is absent from the Arab governments and their citizens. ... There is a difference", he added, "between talking about Israel as an occupying power and to talk about its political system."

CIS Jordan was further discussed in both The New York Times and The Washington Post newspapers, but due to it being an Associated Press story, their contract only allowed them to have access to stories for a short amount of time.
