= Tomorrow's Women =

Tomorrow's Women is a nonprofit that trains, develops and supports Palestinian, Israeli, and American young women in leadership, dialogue and peacemaking skills. Tomorrow’s Women develops these young women to become leaders and bridge divides through mutual respect and the promotion of peace, equality, and justice. The organization’s approach includes a strong emotional foundation and commitment to societal impact. Based in Santa Fe, New Mexico, Tomorrow’s Women operates in Israel, the Palestinian territories, and the United States, offering leadership programming for girls and women ages 15 and up. One of the organization’s foundational methodologies is compassionate listening.

Founded in 2003 in Santa Fe, New Mexico, Tomorrow’s Women began as the organization “Creativity for Peace.” Tomorrow's Women was founded by humanitarian Rachel Kaufman, artist/filmmaker Debra Sugerman, and peace activist/writer Anael Harpaz. The current Executive Director of Tomorrow's Women is Holly Morris. Tomorrow's Women is a member of Alliance for Middle East Peace (ALLMEP).

== Programs ==
Since 2003, Tomorrow's Women has brought a group of young women from the West Bank and Israel to Santa Fe for a leadership training course geared at building peace. They have also provided trauma healing to participants in the West Bank. In July 2025 and 2026, the Tomorrow's Women Teen Leadership Program was held in Switzerland. The Tomorrow's Women Futures Lab, their newest initiative, is a leadership program that supports civic changemakers ready to influence the future of democracy in Israel or Palestine. On Aug. 30 - Sept. 4, 2026, they hosted a summit at a peace center in Annalong, Northern Ireland, with the Nobel Women's Initiative, Ecopeace, and Irish activists involved in crafting the Good Friday agreements. In October 2026, they brought Aziz Abu Sarah, co-author of The Future Is Peace, along with Palestinian and Israeli young women activists, to Santa Fe, New Mexico to have a public conversation about ways to end conflict.
