= Trade Unions Linking Israel and Palestine =

Trade Unions Linking Israel and Palestine (TULIP) was an organisation of unions located in various countries around the world. Its stated main goal was to promote cooperation and reconciliation between Israelis and Palestinians. It supported a two-state solution and opposed boycotts, divestment, and sanctions.

Its website had three language options: English, German and Hebrew. It was not translated into Arabic.

== See also ==
- Palestinian territories
- Middle East economic integration
