= Samer Sinijlawi =

Palestinian political activist and politician

- سامر السنجلاوي

President of Masar Jadid
- Incumbent
- Assumed office September 2026

Personal details
- Born: 1972 (age 53–54) Old City of Jerusalem
- Party: Masar Jadid
- Occupation: Political activist, businessman

Samer Sinijlawi (Arabic: سامر السنجلاوي; also spelled Sinjilawi; born 1972) is a Palestinian political activist and politician from East Jerusalem. A long-time Fatah activist and former international secretary of its youth movement, he became known as a critic of Palestinian Authority president Mahmoud Abbas and as an advocate of direct dialogue with Israelis. In 2026 he founded Masar Jadid (New Path), a party advocating democratic reform, nonviolence and a negotiated two-state solution.

== Early life and career ==
Sinijlawi was born in 1972 in the Old City of Jerusalem. During the First Intifada he joined Fatah and was sentenced by an Israeli military court to five years in prison for acts of violence during the uprising. He has said that he had thrown stones at Israeli soldiers, and that he was released as a result of the Oslo Accords.

After his release he held leadership positions in Fatah's youth movement and, as its international secretary, met members of the youth wings of the Israeli Labor party and of Likud.

Sinijlawi holds a degree in business administration from Birzeit University and a master's degree in conflict resolution from the Hebrew University of Jerusalem. He learned Hebrew in prison and appears regularly in the Israeli media. A businessman, he is the founding chairman of the Jerusalem Development Fund, a nonprofit organization working to improve living conditions for Palestinians in East Jerusalem and the West Bank.

== Political activism ==
After the October 7 attacks Sinijlawi publicly condemned Hamas. In a December 2023 opinion article in The New York Times he called on Abbas to resign, arguing that the Palestinian Authority could legitimately take over the Gaza Strip after the Gaza war only if Abbas and his associates were removed from power, and proposed general elections within two years. In early 2024 he visited the kibbutz of Kfar Aza, scene of one of the massacres of 7 October.

The Times of Israel reported in 2024 that Sinijlawi had held private meetings with senior members of the Knesset from both the governing coalition and the opposition, and that he was known to be a close associate of Mohammad Dahlan, a rival of Abbas. He has worked to promote the two-state plan proposed by the former Israeli prime minister Ehud Olmert and the former Palestinian foreign minister Nasser al-Kidwa. He has argued that Palestinians should pursue statehood by persuading Israelis that a Palestinian state would not threaten their security, rather than by relying on international pressure.

In February 2025 he paid condolence visits to the families of Shiri, Ariel and Kfir Bibas and of Oded Lifshitz, hostages killed in Gaza, writing that Palestinians should condemn the killings and ask for forgiveness. In May 2026 he accused Western governments of propping up Abbas and of betraying Palestinian democracy by treating him as a legitimate leader.

== Masar Jadid ==
In May 2026 Sinijlawi called for the creation of a new liberal-democratic Palestinian party, and by July he was leading the political movement Masar Jadid (New Path). At the party's founding conference in September 2026 he was elected president. The party's programme called for democratic institutions, regular elections, the rule of law and an independent judiciary. It rejected violence as a political instrument and envisaged a Palestinian state on the 1967 borders, founded on what Sinijlawi called four "Ds": development, democracy, deradicalization and demilitarization.

On 26 September Masar Jadid submitted a list of 132 candidates, 40 per cent of them women, for the Palestinian Legislative Council election, then scheduled for 28 November 2026. As a postponement became likely, Sinijlawi appealed to European governments to press Abbas to hold the vote. After Abbas postponed the election to 11 September 2027 by a decree of 10 October, Sinijlawi criticized the decision as serving those who benefit from the status quo.
