= International Communities Organisation =

Non-profit Organisation

- Abbreviation: ICO
- Formation: 2016
- Type: Non-governmental organisation (NGO)
- Legal status: Specialist Consultants to UN Economic and Social Council, since 2021
- Headquarters: London, UK
- Fields: Peacebuilding, Development, Capacity-building, Inclusive Governance, Economic Revitalisation
- Founder and Executive Committee Secretary General: James Holmes
- Website: https://internationalcommunities.org/

International Communities Organisation (ICO) is a London-based international organisation working for peace and reconciliation in divided conflict areas, founded in 2016. ICO's projects include in-country programmes, UN UPR implementation, General Assembly co-ordination, and research development.

== History ==
ICO is based in London and was founded in 2016 by James Holmes.

=== United Nations Special Consultative Status ===
In 2021, ICO was granted the Special Consultative Status by the Economic and Social Council (ECOSOC) at the United Nations, with Mr Abdulla Shahid, the former President of the UN General Assembly appointed as the ICO's International Ambassador.

== Programmes ==
ICO develops projects alongside partners, including the Middle East, Cameroon, Cyprus and Kosovo. ICO has conducted peace-building operations between Israel and Palestine, and engaged in capacity building within the context of the Anglophone crisis in Cameroon. They have also facilitated cross-community dialogue across Greek-Cypriot and Turkish-Cypriot communities, as well as providing a national platform for minority communities in Kosovo.
