= Interfaith Encounter Association =

Israel-based non-profit organization

- Type: Non-profit; NGO
- Location(s): Throughout Israel and the Palestinian Territories, main office in Jerusalem.
- Services: creation and facilitation of groups, meetings and events.
- Fields: cross-cultural communal issues, interfaith issues, peace-building in the Holy Land
- Key people: Yehuda Stolov (founder)
- Website: https://www.interfaith-encounter.org

The Interfaith Encounter Association (IEA) is an Israeli-based non-profit organization founded and directed by Yehuda Stolov. Its primary purpose is to foster dialogue between different religious groups within the Holy Land (specifically Jews, Muslims, Christians, Druze and Baháʼís). This is done on a grassroots level throughout Israel and the Palestinian Territories.

== History ==
Founded in the summer of 2001 ten months after the beginning of the Second Intifada the newly formed IEA set itself to the task of building and strengthening a grassroots interfaith movement for peace, justice, and sustainability in the Holy Land and in the Middle East. Envisioning a society in which the "otherness" of "the other" is not only accepted, but truly understood and respected, the IEA dedicated itself to promoting real coexistence and human peace in the Middle East through cross-cultural study and inter-religious dialogue.

The IEA was launched in July 2001 with the following principles and goals:

- Equal representation of all faiths in the IEA.
- Gender equality in the decision making processes and activities of the IEA.
- Outreach to individuals and communities from all faiths, age groups, walks of life, and levels of society.
- Outreach to individuals and communities across the religious-secular and political spectra.
- Continual recruitment via committed activists on the local and regional levels.
- Implementation of interactive programs that effectively change outlooks and attitudes, such as extended weekend seminars and ongoing study groups.
- Continual development of new models for effective encounter.
- Ongoing evaluation of all strategies and programs.

In 2002 the IEA had over 800 participants in 30 programs. In 2022 it's estimated there were over 4,000 participants in 120 groups in 412 encounters.

== Current Activity ==
=== Overview ===
The IEA operates within three concentric circles of interfaith work. In the first and most preeminent circle – the Inner-Israeli circle – the IEA focuses on the promotion of respectful relations between Jews, Muslims, Christians, Druze and Baháʼís living within Israel. According to their website, this process in turn impacts and enables the second circle – the Israeli-Palestinian circle – where the IEA works in cooperation with 8 Palestinian organizations across the Palestinian Territories. The work of the first and second circles, according to IEA's organizers, aids the work of the third circle – the Middle East region – where the IEA has been a major founder in establishing the Middle East Abrahamic Forum, along with similar organizations from Egypt, Iran, Jordan, Lebanon, Tunisia and Turkey.

Additionally, the IEA maintains three interconnected programmatic sections. The first section, known as the general program, is accessible to all segments of society, regardless of age or sex. The Women's Interfaith Encounter (WIE) was launched in the winter of 2001 to address women's needs while the third programmatic section, the Youth Interfaith Encounter (YIE), designs and implements programs specifically for young adults. The YIE was created in the spring of 2002.

The IEA facilitates interfaith encounters through three program formats: inter-religious study sessions, multi-day conferences, and desert seminars. In bringing Jews, Muslims, Christians, Druze, and Baháʼís together to study topics of relevance from their own religious perspectives, interfaith study is used to achieve two main goals. Primarily, it serves as a vehicle towards understanding, acceptance, and respect for "the other", but it also serves as a way to deepen awareness of one's own religion.

The IEA also maintains connections and relationships with many international interfaith organizations and networks. The IEA is a Member Group of the International Association for Religious Freedom, a Member Group of Roots and Shoots of the Jane Goodall Institute and an Affiliate Member of the Council of Centers on Jewish-Christian Relations. The Jerusalem programs of the IEA function as part of the Partner Cities Network of the Council for a Parliament of the World's Religions and the Goldin Institute. The IEA is also a member in the Committee of Religious NGOs at the United Nations and a founding member of the Partnership Committee for the United Nations Decade of Interreligious Dialogue and Cooperation for Peace.

The group also keeps up-to-date information on their events and meetings at: https://groups.io/g/IEA-stories/topics

=== Group list ===
Listed from north to south:

- Acre
- Karmiel-Majd el-Krum
- M'ghar – Sawa Rabina
- M'ghar – Shibolot
- M'ghar – Bridging
- M'ghar – Lana
- M'ghar - Green Light
- Galilee Women's Interfaith Encounter (WIE)
- Haifa WIE
- University of Haifa Youth Interfaith Encounter (YIE)
- Carmel City
- Wadi Ara WIE
- Living Together in Wadi Ara
- Netania-Qalansawa
- Tel Aviv University YIE
- Petach Tikva – Kafr Qasim
- Tel Aviv-Yafo
- Talking – Mount Scopus YIE
- IEA Reut-Sadaqa
- Study and Dialogue
- Jerusalem WIE
- Jerusalem YIE
- Jewish-Christian study of the Gospel of Matthew
- Abu Dis And Maaleh Adumim
- Ein Karem – Health Equality for all People in Israel
- Jerusalem Arabic Speaking group
- The Future – Mothers and Daughters
- Jerusalem-Hebron YIE
- Eilat

=== Awards/Recognition ===
- In acknowledgement of IEA's work, UNESCO has recognized the IEA as an organization that is contributing to the culture of peace and as an actor of the global movement for a culture of peace (a United Nations initiative).
- Prize for Humanity (February 2006): Awarded to the IEA and its executive director Yehuda Stolov. As described, this award honors those who risked all to protect others of a different faith or ethnic origin.
- Women's Peace Initiative Award (October 2007): Awarded to Ms. Najeeba Sirhan and Ms. Osnat Aram-Daphna, the coordinators of the Karmiel & Majd el-Krum Interfaith Encounter group, for being selected as the recipients of the Women’s Peace Initiative Award of the Tanenbaum Center for Interreligious Understanding.
- INTR°A-Project Award for the Complementation of Religions (Oct, 2007): Awarded to the IEA, included a substantial monetary grant.
- The film Interfaith Encounter in the Galilee, produced by IEA to present the work of its school-twinning project, was awarded the Commendable Effort at the Second World Peace Film & Music Festival by the World Movement for Global Democracy.
- In May 2008, the IEA was one of the sixty projects, selected as the entrepreneurial projects that will change the face of tomorrow to present at the Israeli Presidential Conference – one of only eleven social projects and the only project of peaceful coexistence.
- In June 2014, the founding coordinator of IEA's HEFAPII group was awarded the Prof. R. Bergman Prize for Creativity in Nursing.
- In June 2015, IEA's Executive Director and Assistant Director were awarded the 2015 IIE Victor J. Goldberg Prize for Peace in the Middle East for their joint work in IEA
- In June 2022, IEA was awarded Israel's Presidential Award for Volunteerism

== Media ==
- BBC Heart & Soul Radiocast (from IEA website)
- Chicago Public Radio's Worldview
- Global Dialogue Center
- Justvision
- Washington Jewish Week
- The World

== Self-produced Media ==
- Kermiel-Majd/el-Krum video
- Presentation
