= Nitzanim Nature Reserve =

Public nature reserve in Israel

- שמורת טבע חולות ניצנים
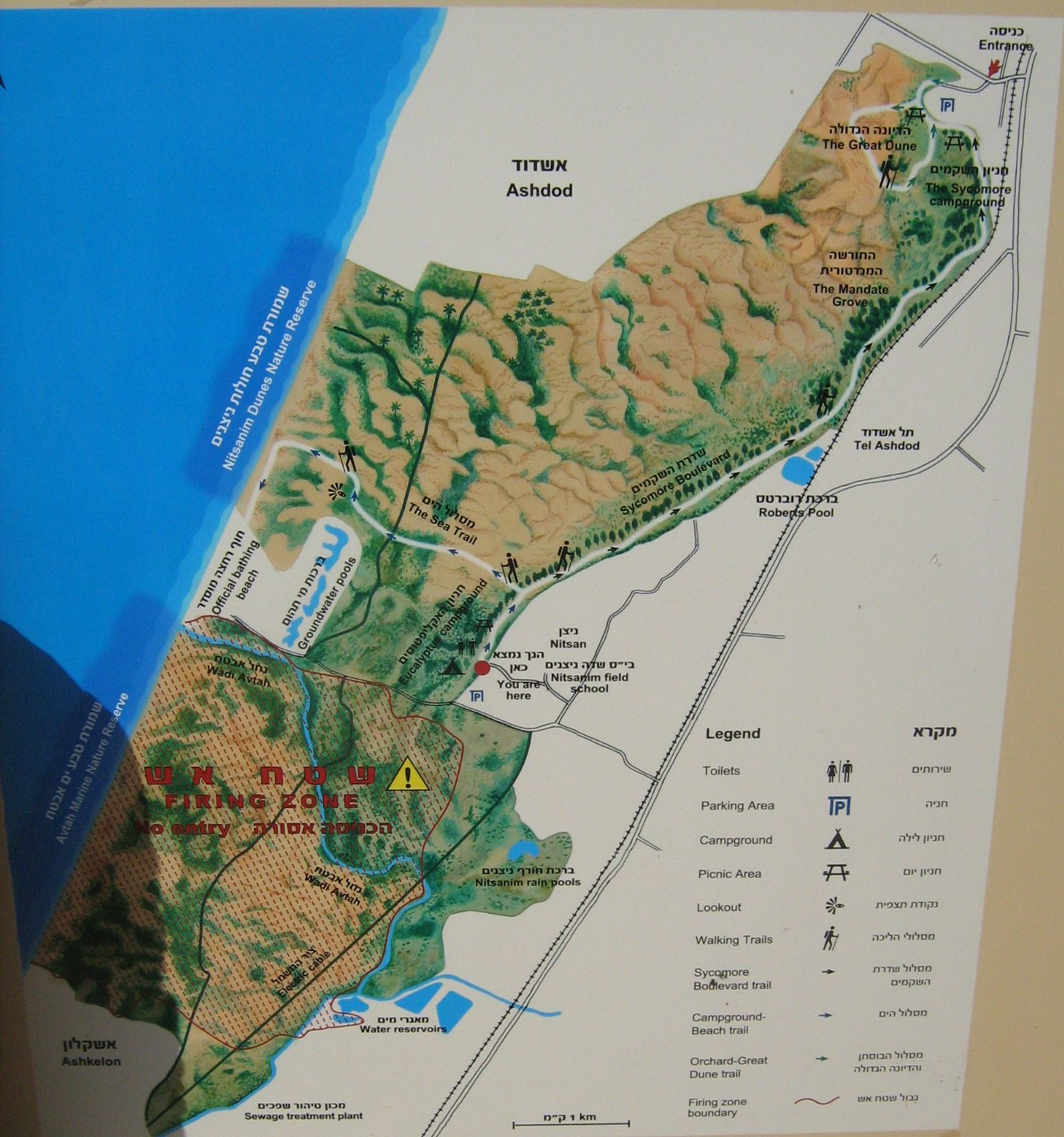
- Nitzanim Nature Reserve map
- Interactive map of Nitzanim Nature Reserve
- Location: Southern Coastal Plain, Israel
- Nearest city: Ashdod, Ashkelon
- Coordinates: 31°44′13″N 34°36′53″E
- Area: 21,600 dunams (21.6 km^{2}; 8.3 sq mi)
- Established: 2005

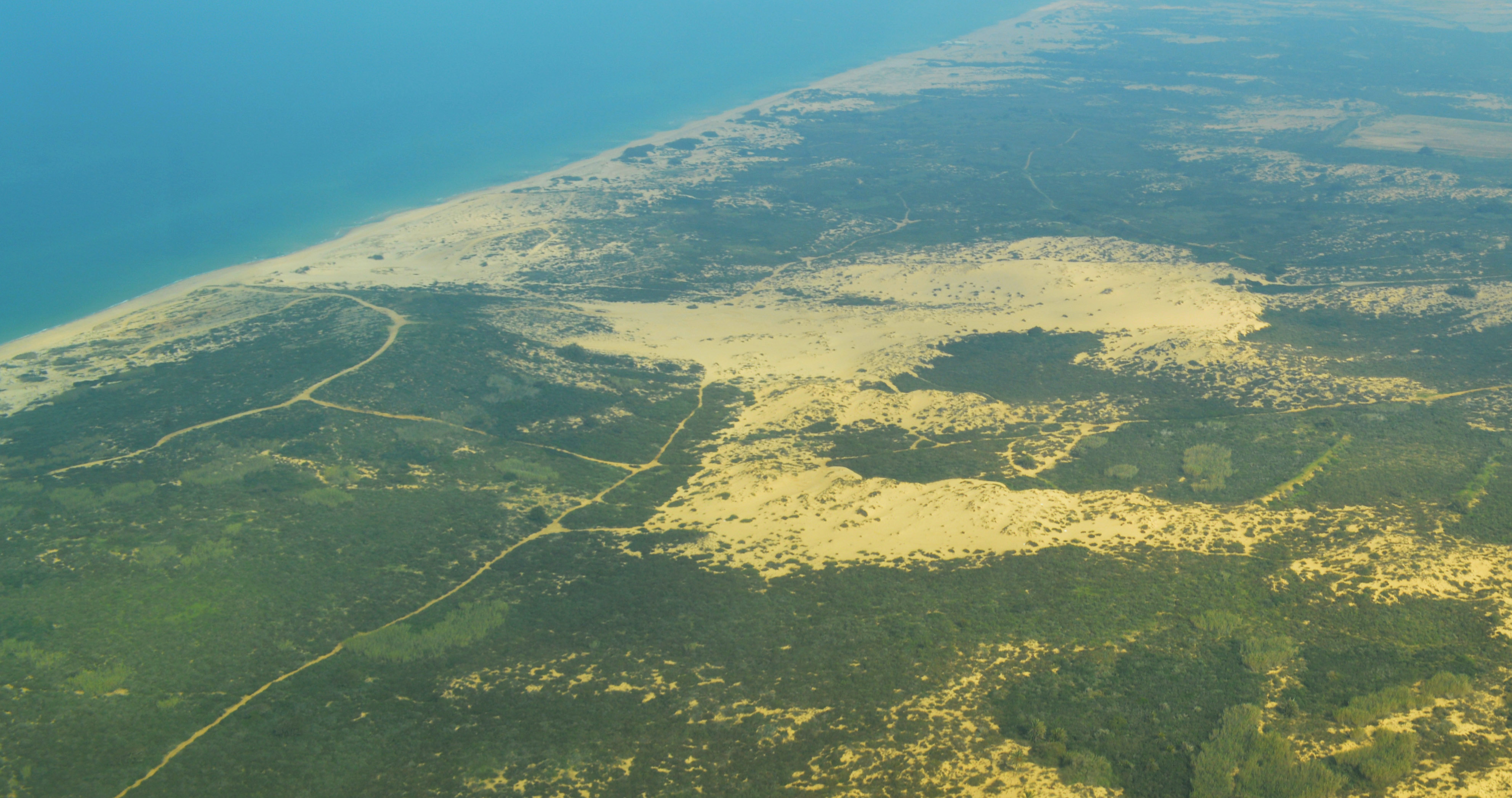
Nitzanim sands aerial view

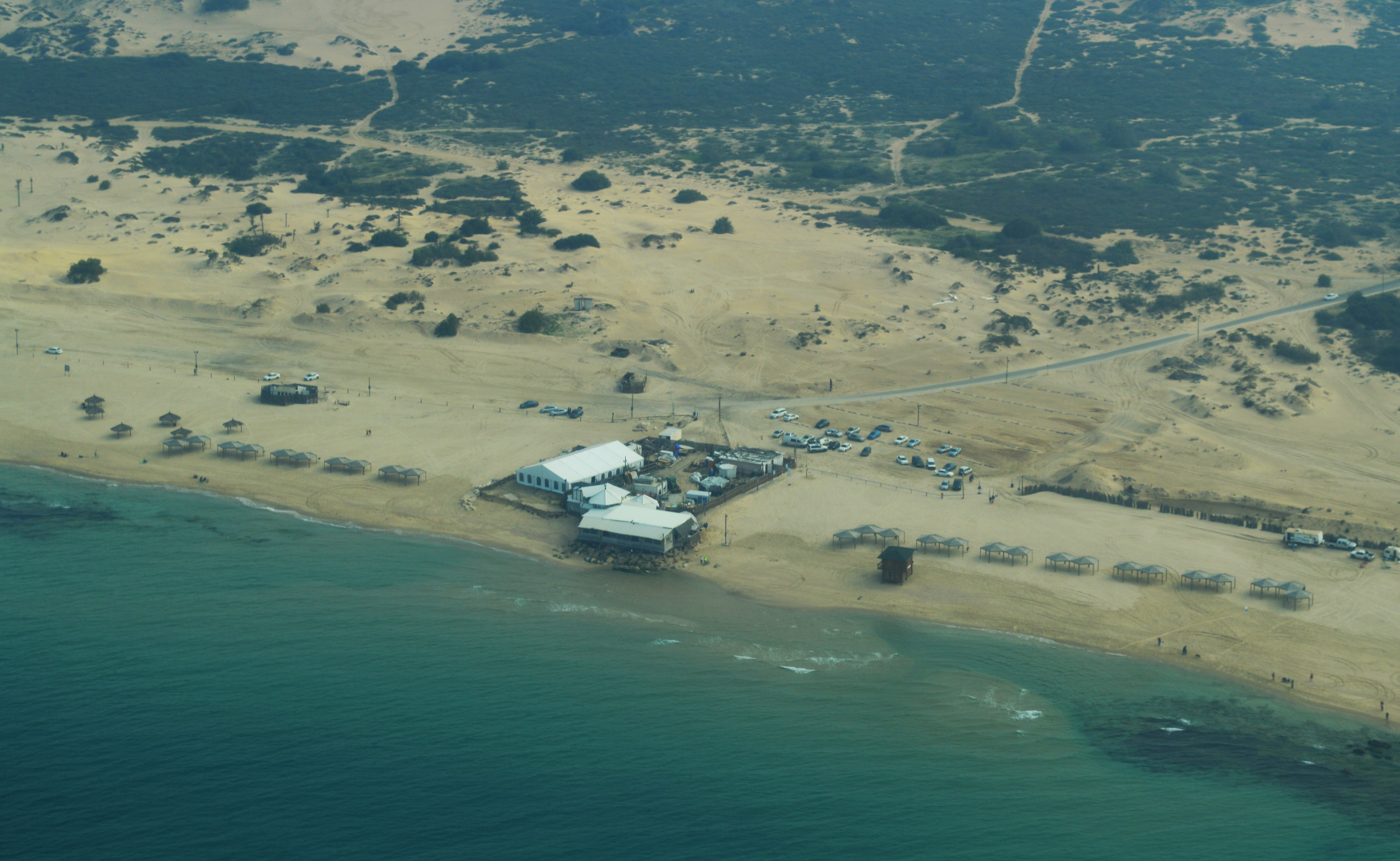
Hof Nitzanim / Nitzanim Beach

The Nitzanim Sand Dune Nature Reserve (Hebrew: שמורת טבע חולות ניצנים) is a 21,600 dunam (2,160 hectare) area within the Nitzanim Sands area between Ashdod and Ashkelon on the Southern Coastal Plain of the Israeli Mediterranean Sea coast.

It was declared as a public area in early 1980s by the Society for the Protection of Nature in Israel and designated as a nature reserve on June 2, 2005.

The Reserve includes a small settlement of Nitzan located in place of the Nitzanim kibbutz, which was resettled some 3–4 km to the south.

The reserve is split in two parts by the Nahal Evtah (Evtach, Avtah) (Hebrew: נחל אבטח) wadi (Wadi el Ibtah) which leads to the Nitzanim Beach by the sea. The beach is a public area not part of the Reserve. The area south of the stream is designated for the IDF recruit training base Batar Nitzanim (Camp Yehoshua) and is closed to public. The northern part is open to public all year round free of charge.

In 2005, during the Israeli disengagement from Gaza there was a controversial plan to resettle some Israeli settlers from Gaza Strip to the Nitzanim Dunes area.

== See also ==
- Ashdod Sand Dune
- 2021 Mediterranean oil spill
