= Tsofen-Tashbik =

Israeli public benefit company

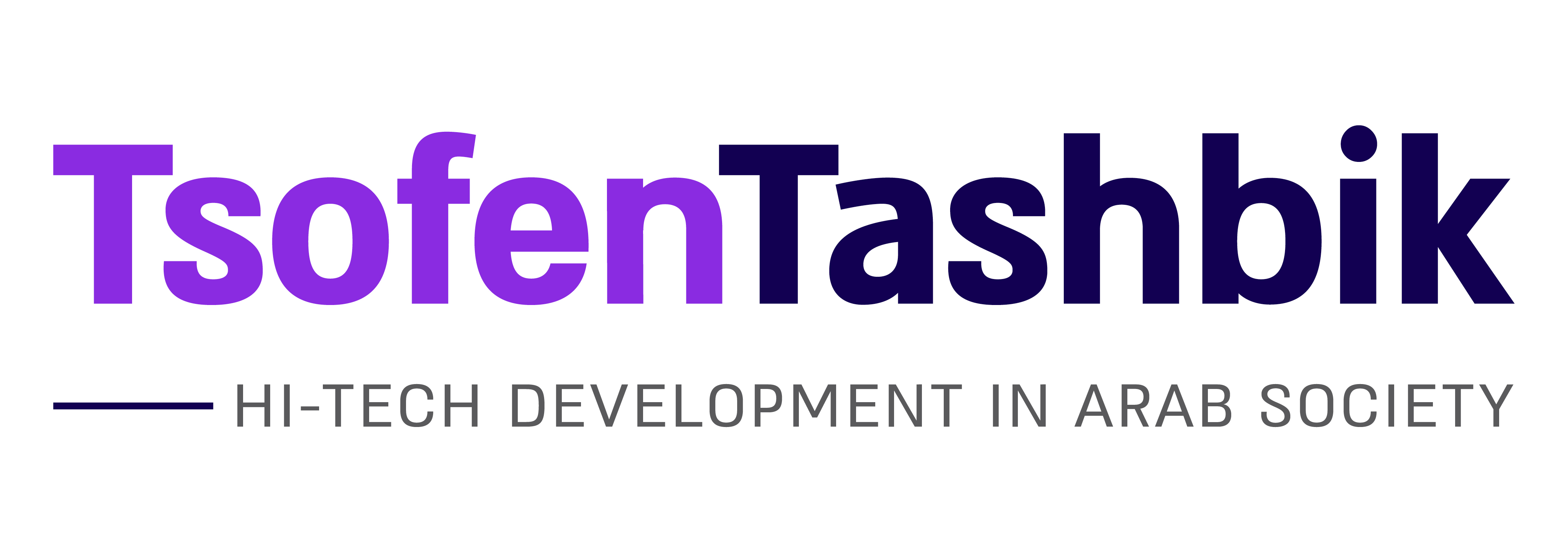
- Formation: 2008; 18 years ago
- Founded at: Nazareth, Israel
- Purpose: Promoting hi-tech in Israeli Arab society
- Headquarters: Nazareth, Israel; Kafr Qasim, Israel
- CEO: Samer Far
- Key people: Fadi Aboud, Alon Bar-Shany, Prof. Ziyad Hanna, David (Dadi) Perlmutter
- Awards: Speaker of the Knesset Quality of Life prize for promoting mutual understanding between Jews and Arabs (2015); Abraham Fund Initiatives Shared Society Award (2018)

Tsofen-Tashbik – Hi-Tech Development in Arab Society Ltd, formerly Tsofen High Technology Centers Ltd, known simply as Tsofen-Tashbik, is an Israeli-registered public benefit company based in Nazareth, northern Israel, and Kafr Qasim, in the centre, established as a joint Arab and Jewish nonprofit organization promoting hi-tech in Israeli Arab society, as a lever for economic development and the creation of a shared society in Israel, based on equal participation in a sustainable economy. Tsofen-Tashbik's mission is to integrate Arabs into Israel’s hi-tech sector and bring hi-tech centers to Arab cities.

== History and leadership ==
Tsofen-Tashbik was formed in Nazareth in 2008 by Smadar Nehab, a hi-tech entrepreneur, Sami Saadi, an independent CPA, and Yossi Coten, a former Amdocs executive. Saadi remained one of two Co-CEOs until stepping down at the end of February 2022. From the start of 2023, Tsofen-Tashbik moved to a single-CEO model whilst remaining a Jewish-Arab prganisation in terms of board leadership and staff. The current CEO is Samer Far, who replaced Maisam Jaljuli (Hebrew), in October 2026. Tsofen-Tashbik's board, which is half Jewish and half Arab, and whose members include professionals with backgrounds in hi-tech, academia, and business, is co-chaired by Fadi Aboud, an Intel fellow at Intel Corporation, and Alon Bar-Shany, who spent 25 years in a variety of roles including CFO, Corporate VP Finance and—for 16 years until his retirement in 2020—CEO, at HP Indigo Division. Tsofen-Tashbik established the Public Council for Promoting Hi-Tech in the Arab Society in Israel, to support and facilitate its mission; it is co-chaired by Professor Ziyad Hanna, Corporate VP at Cadence and visiting professor at Oxford University, and David (Dadi) Perlmutter, former executive vice president, Intel Corporation.

When Tsofen-Tashbik was established, Arab engineers accounted for 0.5% of employees in Israeli hi-tech (about 350 people). Today, they represent 3.7% (about 5,500 people), and Tsofen-Tashbik's stated goal is to increase that percentage to at least 10% by 2025. At a time when there is a shortage of over 15,000 hi-tech engineers in Israel, the Arab community is a key demographic group with the potential to help meet the shortage, with thousands of suitably qualified Arabs who, for various reasons, either do not seek employment in hi-tech or cannot find a way in. In addition, increasing numbers of Arabs are studying hi-tech related subjects at tertiary level: whereas there were only 1,600 Arab graduates in high-tech academic studies between 1985 and 2014, over 2,200 Arab students enrolled in high-tech academic studies in 2016 alone.

Tsofen-Tashbik is a member of Co-Impact (formerly Collective Impact), the partnership for a Breakthrough in Arab Employment, which is a partner in ex-President Reuven Rivlin’s Israeli Hope initiative focusing on four aspects of Israeli society: Academia, Education, Sports and Employment.

== Tsofen-Tashbik's theory of change ==
By supporting the integration of Arab engineers in Israel’s hi-tech industry, Tsofen-Tashbik aims to influence a deep institutional effect on the industry’s make-up and culture, towards a wider impact: (a) As the Arab community contributes a greater share to Israel’s economic growth, it will also enjoy its benefits more equally, improving the socio-economic status of the Arab community and reducing disparities, and (b) Arabs and Jews can develop a shared society, beginning in the technological work-space, where daily work interactions and relationships are developed that change prejudice, stereotypes and biases.

== Tsofen-Tashbik's model ==
- Nurturing human talent in Arab society by exposing Arab students to hi-tech, providing applied technological training to academic students and graduates, and building networks for Arab hi-tech professionals, in cooperation with leading hi-tech firms.
- Changing the hi-tech industry landscape by placing thousands of Arab engineers in jobs, by working with hi-tech firms to make recruitment and hiring policies more inclusive, and by bringing hi-tech businesses to Arab cities.
- Changing national policies and priorities by ‘mainstreaming’ its programs within the government, academia, and business sectors.

== Key Tsofen-Tashbik accomplishments and impact 2008–2025 ==
- Tsofen-Tashbik has placed a quarter of the 16,000 Arab hi-tech employees in Israel today (there were only 350 Arabs in hi-tech when Tsofen-Tashbik was founded), contributing billions to Israel’s GDP annually.
- Exposing more than 15,000 Arab high school students to the hi-tech industry and opening to them the option of a hi-tech career. The program was discontinued when it was mainstreamed in the school system.
- One hundred industry exposure workshops for thousands of college and university students studying for hi-tech relevant degrees, introducing them to the possibilities of a career in hi-tech.
- More than 2,000 Arab undergraduate students and recent graduates completed 80 applied technological courses.
- 12 management development courses for around 300 candidates with limited industry experience.
- 1,864 candidates received mentoring from Jewish or Arab industry veterans; many mentees return to volunteer as mentors for their successors.
- Annual career fairs exposing thousands of students and recent graduates to hundreds of companies recruiting Arab engineers.
- Between 2007 and 2022, Tsofen-Tashbik facilitated the opening of over 50 companies, branches and projects in Nazareth, of the 80 or so that operate there today, including Microsoft, Amdocs, Broadcom, Alpha Omega, Galil Software, SalesForce. This increased the number of hi-tech engineers working in the city from 35 in 2008 to some 1,300 by 2022, of which four-fifths were Arabs, and 26% women.
- Tsofen's 5-year Plan for hi-tech and innovation in Arab society, developed with the National Arab Local Councils Committee in Israel, was incorporated fully into government resolution 550, fully budgeted and confirmed by the Knesset in November 2021.
- Tsofen-Tashbik reports that their work is at great risk with delays in Israeli government funding from 2024 and President Trump's review of foreign assistance in 2025.

== Awards ==
- 2012: Sami Saadi (Founding CEO) named in The Marker 100 Most Influential List
- 2015: Speaker of the Knesset (Israel's parliament) Quality of Life prize for promoting mutual understanding between Jews and Arabs
- 2017: Sami Saadi (Founding CEO) named in Calcalist 100 Most Influential List
- 2018: Abraham Fund Initiatives Shared Society Award
- 2018: Walaa Ibrahim, Tsofen's Head of Human Capital Development, was named by The Marker as one of 21 Women Changing the Face of Israeli Hi-Tech
- 2019: Prof Ziyad Hanna (Co-Chair of Tosfen’s Public Council) named in The Marker 100 Most Influential List
- 2021: Tsofen chosen as semi-finalist #15 in the iValues: Rethink Politics in the MENA Region Awards for its 5-Year Policy Plan for Advancement of Hi-Tech in Israel's Arab Society.
- 2021: Sami Saadi (Founding & Retiring CEO) and David (Dadi) Perlmutter (Co-Chair of Tsofen’s Public Council) awarded Honorary Fellowships from Afeka Tel Aviv Academic College of Engineering.
