= Middle East (disambiguation) =

The Middle East is a historical and political region of Afro-Eurasia.

The Middle East may also refer to:

- Greater Middle East, a new proposed political region
- Middle East Airlines, the flag carrier airline of Lebanon
- The Middle East (nightclub), a live music venue, bar, and restaurant in Cambridge, Massachusetts, USA
- Middle East, Baltimore, Maryland, United States, a neighborhood
- Middle East Television, a Christian television station
- The Middle East (band), an Australian Indie band from Townsville, Queensland
- The Middle East (magazine), a London-based magazine
- Mideast Youth, a Bahrain-based regional digital network
- Mid-East Region, Ireland, a region of the Republic of Ireland
