= University of the Middle East Project =

Independent non-governmental organization

- Formation: 1997
- Type: International NGO
- Headquarters: Somerville, MA, USA; Madrid, Spain
- President: Dr. Hala Taweel
- Website: http://www.ume.org

University of the Middle East Project (UME) is an independent non-governmental organization whose people-to-people exchange programs bring together secondary school educators from across the Middle East and North Africa (MENA) and the United States with the aim of enhancing pedagogical skills and encouraging cross-cultural dialogue and understanding. In the United States, UME is a 501(c)(3) not-for-profit organization, registered as The Center for Higher Education in the Middle East, Inc.

== History ==
The University of the Middle East Project was founded in 1997 by a group of graduate students from the Middle East and North Africa who were studying at universities around Boston, including MIT, Harvard Kennedy School, Boston College, and The Fletcher School at Tufts. Initially, the group's goal was to build a physical campus in the Middle East which would welcome students from all across the region. However, the strategic focus in more recent years has been on cultivating excellence among teachers and in MENA school systems.

== Programs ==
=== Teacher Education Institute ===
The flagship program of UME, the Teacher Education Institute (TEI) is an intensive month-long professional development and cultural exchange course that takes place annually during the summer. TEI participants are secondary school educators from the MENA region. The program curriculum focuses on innovative teaching methodologies, including the use of technology in classrooms, conflict and cooperation in schools, cross-cultural education, civic education, and service learning.

=== Civic Engagement Workshop ===
The Civic Engagement Workshop (CEW) is a week-long follow-on program for the TEI which unites alumni from one MENA country with American high school teachers. The workshop furthers the professional development of both MENA-region and US teachers, and promotes regional and international collaboration on projects, events and teaching strategies. The CEW also serves a crucial role as a forum for TEI alumni to develop inclusive, community-oriented after-school activities for their students. UME ran CEWs in Morocco in 2006 and Jordan in 2007.

=== Collaborative Art Initiative ===
The Collaborative Art Initiative (CAI) is a three-phase educational and cultural exchange program which will take place during 2008 and 2009 in the U.S., Jordan, and Morocco. The CAI will bring together teachers, youth leaders, and young people in the spirit of artistic expression to create sacred public spaces where mindful interaction, open dialogue, and collaboration become possible and tangible. The CAI is based on the principles of Professor Mark Cooper's book, Making Art Together.

=== Seminar on Identity and Education ===
UME ran the Seminar on Identity and Education Across the Mediterranean (IDEAmed) seminar in Sevilla, Spain in 2006. The program convened a group of secondary school teachers from across the Mediterranean region to explore and deepen their understanding of identity and its relation to school culture, classroom practice, pedagogy and curriculum. In addition to attending presentations and workshops, each participant developed an educational activity for their students touching on issues such as class, religion, gender, and ethnic and cultural narratives.

=== Education Leadership Institute ===
UME held the Education Leadership Initiative (ELI) in 2004 in Toledo, Spain. The ELI focused on the systemic challenges in K-12 education in the Middle East and North Africa. The two-week program brought together a select group of alumni of the 1999-2004 Teacher Education Institutes (TEI) to collectively learn to tap the potential of organized, collective action and negotiation techniques, and to facilitate region-wide systemic changes in K-12 education.

=== Institute in Governance, Public Policy, and Civil Society ===
Institutes in Governance, Public Policy, and Civil Society (IGPC) have taken place in Spain in 2002 and 2003. Goals for the IGPC included gaining a better understanding of the role of civil society in promoting good governance and creating a network to nurture and sustain the relationships between the participants of the Institute and strengthen cooperation among their organizations and institutions.

=== Institute in Sustainable Development Policies ===
The Institute for Sustainable Development (ISD), which UME held in Casablanca, Morocco in 2000, was an interdisciplinary program designed to address the economics and politics of sustainable development at the local, national, regional, and global levels in the Middle East and North Africa. Taught by leading academics from institutions in the United States, Europe, and the MENA region, the ISD explored the most pressing sustainability issues facing the MENA region, including water management, renewable energy, industrial ecology, and sustainable agriculture.

== Board of directors ==
President: Hala Taweel Directors: Diego Hidalgo, Anne-Marie Codur, Farouk El-Baz, Roy Nirschel Advisors: Andre Azoulay, Ali Belhaj, Samia Farouki, Devens Hamlen, Rita Hauser, Robert Karam, Hasan Khan, Leah McIntosh, Mark Mendell, Timothy Phillips, Dr. Shems Prinzivalli, William Prinzivalli, Henry Rosovsky, George Salem, Fuad Safwat, Oliver Stalter, Henry Steiner, Ahmed Snoussi, Mustafa Terrab, Desmond Tutu, and James Zogby.

== Funding and Affiliations ==
UME has received substantial funding from the FRIDE Foundation, the U.S. Department of State Bureau for Educational and Cultural Affairs, and Roger Williams University in Bristol, Rhode Island.

UME maintains unofficial affiliations with Roger Williams University, Harvard University, and Boston College.
