= EcoOcean =

- Formation: 2001
- Founder: Weil family
- Type: NGO, Non-profit organization
- Purpose: Marine Conservation, Environmentalism
- Location: Israel
- Website: www.ecoocean.org

EcoOcean is an Israeli non-profit environmental organization that was founded in 2001, working to preserve the marine and coastal environments, by promoting marine research, education and community engagement.

== History ==
EcoOcean was founded by the Weil family and a group of Israeli scientists in 2001. The organization's goal is to promote the preservation of the coastal and marine environment through research, education and broad community activities.

== Activities ==
=== Research ===
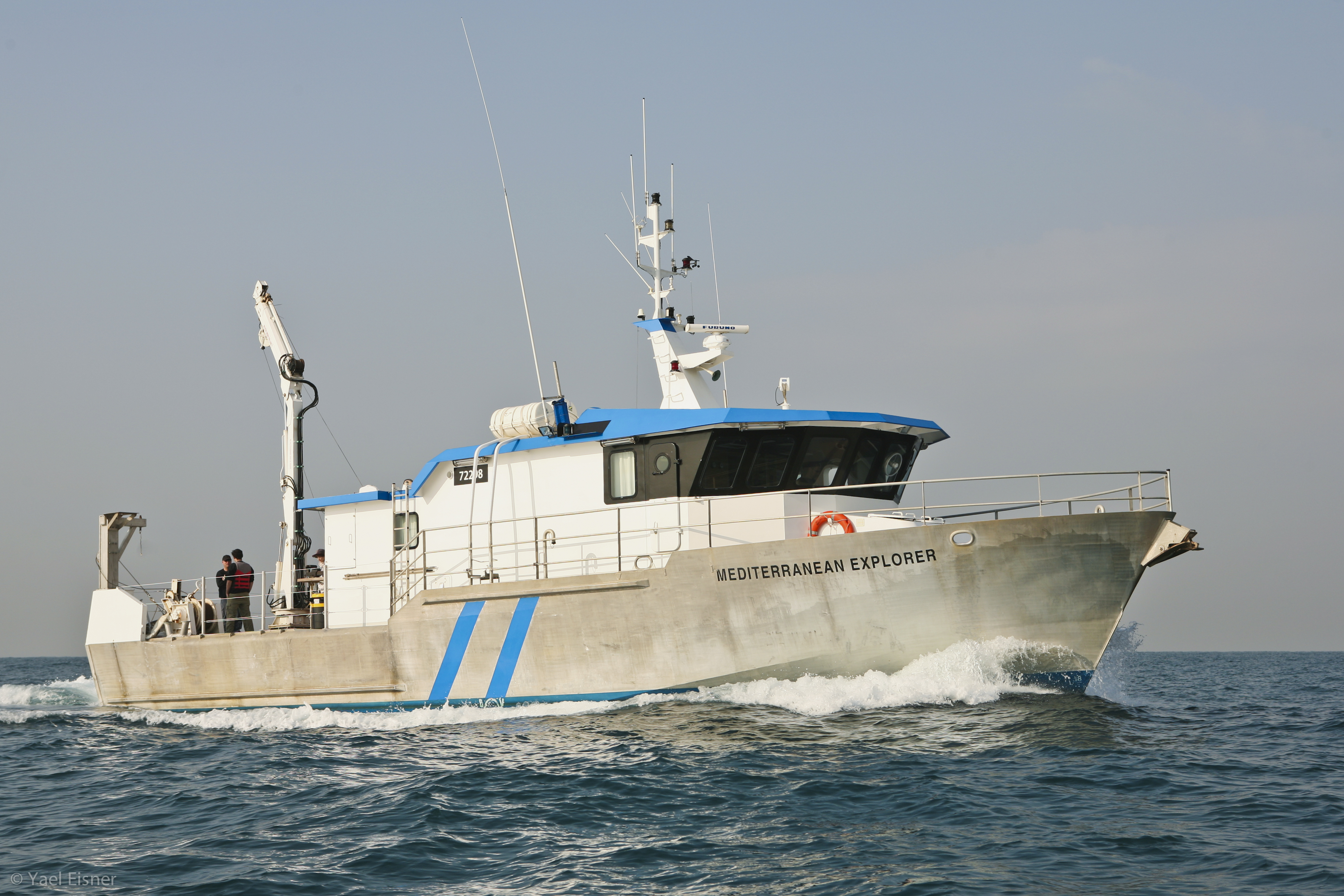
RV Mediterranean Explorer research vessel

EcoOcean operates the R/V Mediterranean Explorer research vessel and underwater robot (ROV) that enables local and world researchers, who are often subsidized by the organization to expand knowledge, improving the state of the marine and coastal environment. The research vessel is also used in co-operation with research and industrial institutes around the world for scientific expeditions such as TASCMAR and ODYSSEA.

==== TASCMAR ====
TASCMAR is a research project under the Horizon 2020 Framework Program for Research and Innovation of the European Union. It brings together researchers from leading research and industrial institutions in Europe, Thailand and Israel, and is managed by the National Center for Scientific Research in France (CNRS). The study was designed to examine the efficacy and feasibility of using bioactive chemical compounds derived from marine invertebrates, bacteria and algae in the pharmaceutical and cosmeceutical industries to create medicinal and cosmetic products, especially for the treatment of aging-associated ailments and diseases. Most of this study is conducted in deep water, where there is greater potential for locating organisms that have not yet been studied in order to find new sources for the production of natural materials.

==== ODYSSEA ====
Participation in ODYSSEA, which is a project that received funding from the EU's Horizon 2020 Program in June 2017. ODYSSEA is dedicated to developing an “integrated and user-friendly” platform to integrate a network of observatory and forecasting systems across the Mediterranean Basin, both in the open sea and in the coastal region. The data will be extracted from the numerous databases operated by the different agencies, public authorities, research institutions and universities of the European Union, the Mediterranean and non-EU countries, and will serve as a region-wide platform and public portal for existing monitoring and network stations in the Mediterranean. Data gaps will be bridged by the development and operation of nine regional monitoring stations and civil science networks. The ODYSSEA consortium comprises 28 partners, eight academic partners, three technology companies, seven information and computer service developers, six NGOs, two policy specialists and two entities that will engage in the management of this complex project spanning 14 EU and non-EU countries (Greece, Turkey, Israel, Italy, Spain, Portugal, Great Britain, France, Germany, the Netherlands, Tunisia, Morocco, Algeria, and Egypt).

=== Education ===
EcoOcean operates the ‘Megalim Center’, an educational center that teaches marine and environmental sciences at Kibbutz Sdot Yam in Israel. The educational programs include: field trips, research studies, seminars, sea/beach activities and annual education program in schools across the country. The organization also host lecturers from the maritime field and produce conferences, exhibitions and beach clean-up campaigns.

=== FEE ===
EcoOcean is the Israel representative of the Foundation for Environmental Education (FEE), running its global Blue Flag beach program. The Blue Flag is an eco-label awarded to bathing beaches and marinas based on strict criteria that must be met on environmental education, seawater quality, services to the public and environmental management. Other programs operated by EcoOcean on behalf of the FEE include ‘Young Reporters for the Environment’, which promotes involvement of youth in environmental issues through journalistic tools, and the Green Key International program which is an eco-label for the hospitality industry.

=== Protecting Sharks and Stingrays ===
Throughout the Mediterranean, shark populations have dwindled by more than 90%, but in recent years an amazing phenomenon has been witnessed along the Israeli coast - dozens of sharks now gather near the power stations and fish cages in the deep sea. Israel is the only country in the Mediterranean where sharks and stingrays are protected by law. It is the case that although fishing of these species is prohibited, illegal fishing does continue. EcoOcean actively engages in and lobbies for better enforcement of the law and other measures to protect both sharks and stingrays. In 2015, EcoOcean published an Action Plan for the protection of sharks and stingrays in the Mediterranean Sea of Israel. The association assists in shark research and engages in efforts to raise awareness of the importance of protecting sharks and stingrays.
