= Bani Khalid (tribe) =

Arab tribal confederation

Bani Khalid بني خالد
- Ethnicity: Arab
- Nisba: Al-Khalidi الخالدي
- Location: Saudi Arabia, Qatar, Bahrain, Kuwait, United Arab Emirates, Iraq, Egypt, Palestine, Syria, Jordan
- Descended from: Khalid ibn al-Walid (disputed)
- Parent tribe: Quraysh (disputed)
- Language: Arabic (Gulf, Najdi)
- Religion: Islam

Bani Khalid (Arabic: بني خالد) is an Arab tribal confederation mainly inhabiting the Arabian Peninsula. The tribe ruled southern Iraq, Kuwait, and Eastern Arabia (al-Hasa and al-Qatif) from the 15th century to the 18th century, and again under the protection of the Ottoman Empire during the early 19th century. At its greatest extent, the domain of Bani Khalid extended from Iraq in the north to the borders of Oman in the south, and Bani Khalid wielded political influence by ruling the region of Najd in central Arabia. Most of the tribe's members presently reside in eastern and central Saudi Arabia, while others live in Iraq, Kuwait, Qatar, Bahrain, Syria, Palestine, Lebanon and the United Arab Emirates. Bani Khalid has both Shia Muslim and Sunni Muslim members.

== Lineage ==
The tribe traditionally claims descent from Khalid ibn al-Walid a companion of Muhammad, and esteemed general who was crucial in the Muslim conquest of Persia and the Levant. This claim has been questioned by Arab genealogists who have suggested that the tribe may descend from his relatives from Banu Makhzum and not from Khalid himself, alternatively, they have largely been attributed to.

There are several accounts regarding the lineage of the Banu Khalid; the most prominent among them are:

- They are from the tribe of Banu Rabi'ah bin 'Amir bin Sa'sa'a from the Hawazin tribe
- They are a tribe from Banu Ghazia from the Tayy tribe
- They are a tribe from the offspring of Khalid ibn al-Walid, from Banu Makhzum, from the Quraysh tribe

A number of lineages from the Quraish tribe mentioned the discontinuation of Khalid bin Al-Walid's offspring and the extinction of his son, and that his relative Ayoub bin Salama bin Abdullah bin Al-Walid bin Al-Walid bin Al-Mughirah Al-Makhzumi Al-Qurashi inherited the money of Khaled bin Al-Walid bin Al-Mughira, after the death of his last descendant.

The oldest historical text in which the tribe of Bani Khalid was mentioned is what was reported by Ibn al-Atheer in his book "Al-Kamil fi al-Tarikh", speaking about the events of the year 513 AH, saying: (a group of people known as Bani Khalid); It was mentioned that their homes are near Lake Tiberias in Palestine, but the Bani Khalid that Ibn al-Athir mentioned here is not necessarily the current tribe of Bani Khalid.

== History ==
=== Jabrid Emirate ===
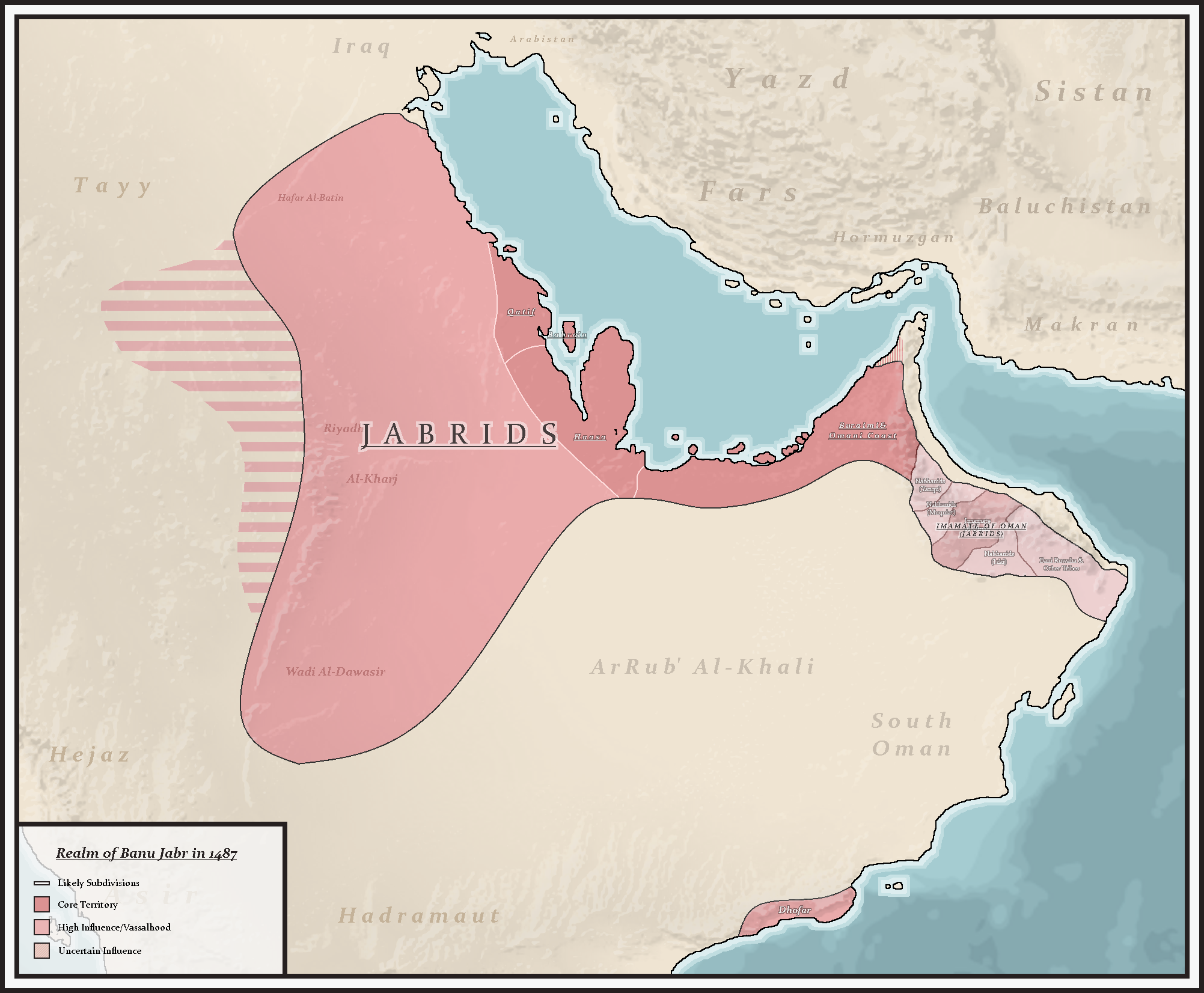
Realm of the Jabrids during Ajwad bin Zamil's reign

The Jabrids were the ruling class of the Bani Khaild tribe in Nejd. The Jabrids established the Arab dynasty that ruled Eastern Arabia and Nejd from the 15th to the 16th century.

Banu Jabr followed the Maliki Sunni school, and made Al-Ahsa, the capital for their emirate and the stronghold for the Bani Khaild tribe.

The descendants of Banu Jabr can still be found in Al-Qassim, Saudi Arabia, mainly as members of the Al-Mohaimeed family, Al-Dakhil family, and the descendants of the Shiekh Sultan Bin Saud Al-Jabri in Oman.

=== First Khalidi Emirate ===
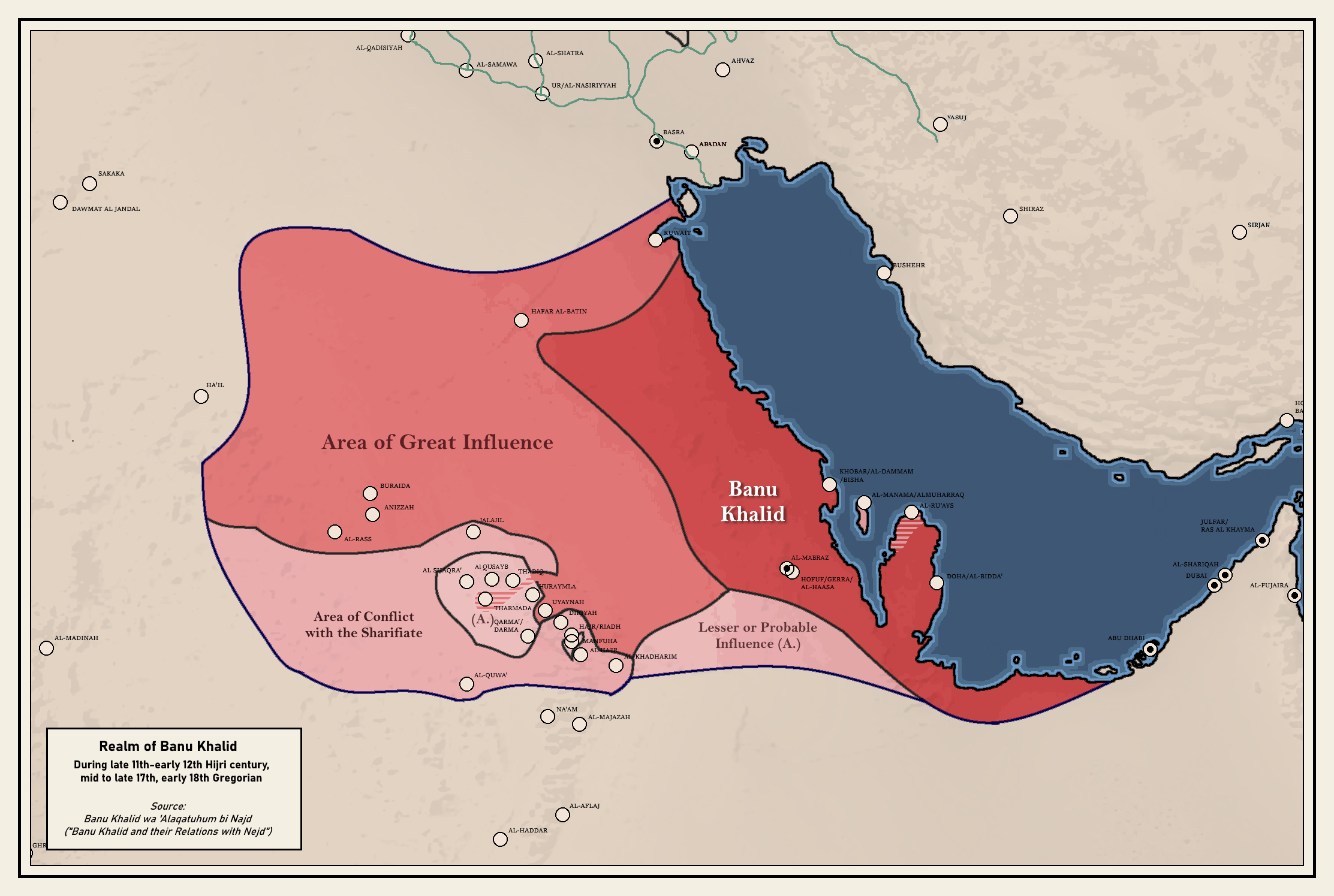
Map of Bani Khalid Emirate

The main branches of the tribe are the Al Asfour, Al Humaid, the Juboor, the Du'um, the Al Janah, the Al suhoob, the Grusha, the Al Musallam, the 'Amayer, the Al Subaih and the Mahashir & Nahood. The chieftainship of the Bani Khalid has traditionally been held by the Al Humaid. The Bani Khalid dominated the deserts surrounding the Al-Hasa and Al-Qatif during the 15th and 18th century. Under Barrak ibn Ghurayr of the Al Humaid, the Bani Khalid expelled Ottoman forces from the cities and towns in 1670 and proclaimed their rule over the region. Ibn Ghurayr made Al-Mubarraz his capital where remnants of his castle stand today. According to Arabian folklore, one chief of the Bani Khalid attempted to protect the prized desert bustard (Habari) from extinction by prohibiting the bedouin in his realm from poaching the bird's eggs, earning the tribe the appellation of "protectors of the eggs of the Habari", an allusion to the chief's absolute supremacy over his realm. The first chieftain of the "Khawalid" was Haddori.

=== Fall to the Saudis ===
The Bani Khalid of eastern Arabia maintained ties with members of their tribe who had settled in Nejd during their earlier migration eastwards, and also cultivated clients among the rulers of the Najdi towns, such as the Al Mu'ammar of al-Uyayna. When the emir of Uyayna adopted the ideas of Muhammad ibn Abd al-Wahhab, the Khalidi chief ordered him to cease support for Ibn Abd al-Wahhab and expel him from his town. The emir agreed, and Ibn Abd al-Wahhab moved to neighboring Dir'iyyah, where he joined forces with the Al Saud. The Bani Khalid remained staunch enemies of the Saudis and their allies and attempted to invade Nejd and Diriyyah in an effort to stop Saudi expansion. Their efforts failed, and after conquering Nejd, the Saudis invaded the Bani Khalid's domain in al-Hasa and deposed the Al 'Ura'yir in 1793. In the early 1950s, many Al Arabi people originating from Iraq migrated to Saudi Arabia Al Qassim.

=== Khalidis of Jerusalem ===
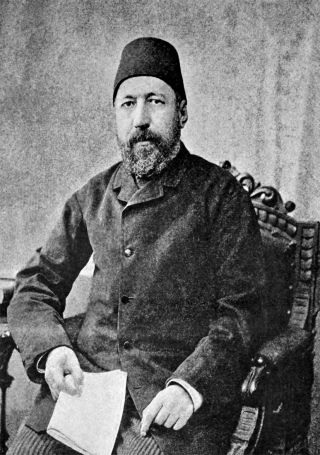
Yusuf Diya al-Khalidi, mayor of Jerusalem

The Khalidis of Jerusalem rose to prominence during Mamluk rule. They became one of the most powerful families in Palestine, rivaled by the equally powerful Husayni clan as well as the Nashashibis. The Khalidi family held the banner of the Qaysi faction in Jerusalem while the Husaynis held the banner of the Yamanis. After the fall of Egypt and the Levant to the Ottomans, the Khalidis grew in power, with many of them holding key offices.

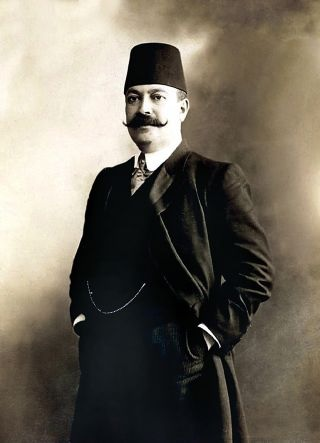
Ruhi al-Khalidi

After the Tanzimat reforms were completed in the Ottoman Empire, it adopted a new government type, modeled on that of the average European nation. In accordance with the Ottoman Constitution of 1876, which had turned the Ottoman Empire into a constitutional monarchy, the Ottoman Empire now had a parliament with representatives from every province. Yusuf Dia-Uddin Pasha Al Khalidi was the representative of Jerusalem in parliament, he was also the mayor of Jerusalem from 1870 to 1876 and 1878 to 1879. Yusuf Dia Pasha, had studied in Malta and learned English and French. He received a letter from Zadok Kahn Chief Rabbi of France, calling him to the Zionist cause. He replied with a letter, "In the Name of God, Leave Palestine Alone". Zadok Kahn showed the letter to Theodor Herzl the founder of political Zionism, Herzl replied "If we are not wanted in Palestine, we will search and we will find elsewhere what we seek". Ruhi al-Khalidi Yusuf Dia Pasha's nephew, Ruhi al Khalidi was the mayor of Jerusalem from 1899 to 1907 and the deputy of the head of parliament in 1911, he wrote extensively on early Zionism and the threats they posed, he was known to be very cross with the ruling political party the Ittihad ve Terraki for their lack of seriousness with dealing with the Zionist threat. His rising political career ended with his death to typhoid in 1913. Both Yusuf and Ruhi were part of the Ittihad be Terraki, a right wing party believing in Ottoman Islamist Nationalism, as opposed to their Husseini rivals who were Arab Nationalists.

After the collapse of the Ottomans in WWI due to the Great Arab Revolt, a British Mandate was set up in Palestine, charged with modernizing Palestine and granting it Independence when it was "ready". This period was marked by Arab Nationalists strengthening their regime under the Grand Mufti of Jerusalem Amin al-Husseini. Due to the Khaldis opposition to Nationalism, they had difficult times getting back into politics. With the exceptions of Hussein al-Khalidi who was mayor from 1934 to 1937, and Mustafa al-Khalidi who was the last Arab Mayor of Jerusalem from 1938 to 1944. Mustafa was like his relatives accused of Zionism, he replied by saying,"We must recognise the facts; the Zionists have migrated to this country, become citizens, have become Palestinians, and they cannot be thrown into the sea. Likewise, some of them have bought land and received deeds in exchange for money and we must recognize them. There is no point in closing our eyes about such things". After the creation of the State of Israel, most Arab countries had turned into monarchies, making ascension into the political system difficult. Hussein al-Khalidi was appointed Prime Minister of Jordan, but his cabinet was rejected multiple times however, and was forced to give up the position. His memoirs "An era of courtesies went on" were published by the Khalidi Library in Jerusalem. Descendants of the Jerusalemite branch have become highly influential academics. Walid Khalidi is a professor of history at Oxford University. The nephew of Hussein al-Khalidi, Rashid Khalidi, is a professor at Columbia University and has written extensively on the Palestinian Exodus.

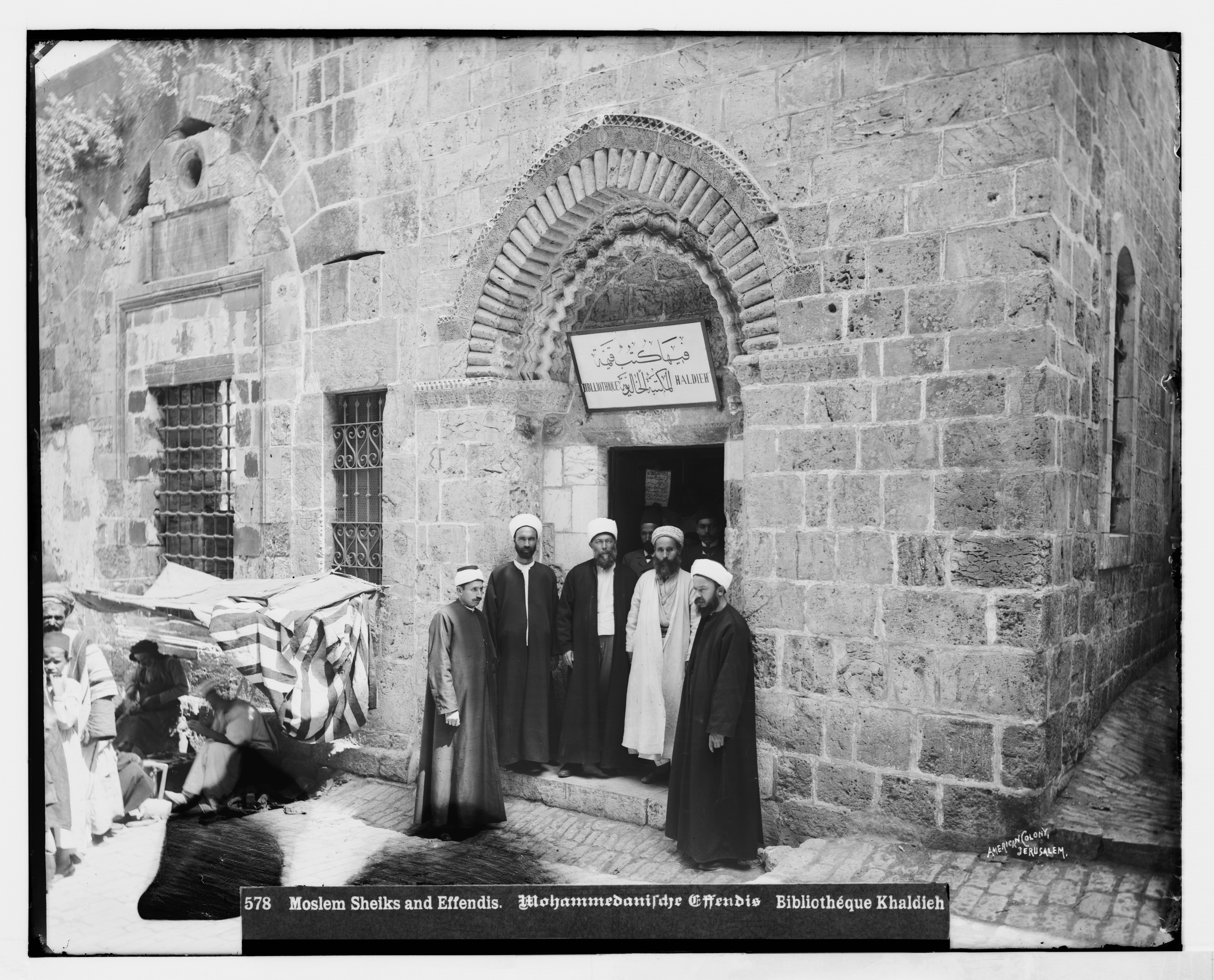
Khalidi Library, from the opening ca. 1900. From right: Hajj Raghib Al-Khalidi, Sheikh Taher al Jaza’ireh (from Damascus), Sheikh Musa Shafiq Al-Khalidi, Sheikh Khalil Al-Khalidi, Sheikh Muhammad Al-Habbal (from Beirut)

The Khalidis of Jerusalem established the Khalidi Library near the Aqsa Mosque, which remains open.

=== Return and fall from power ===
When the Ottomans invaded Arabia and overthrew the Al Saud in 1818, they conquered al-Hasa, al-Qatif and reinstated members of the Al 'Uray'ir as rulers of the region. The Bani Khalid were no longer the potent military force they once were at this time, and tribes such as the Ajman, the Dawasir, Subay' and Mutayr began encroaching on the Bani Khalid's desert territories. They were also beset by internal quarrels over leadership. Though the Bani Khalid were able to forge an alliance with the 'Anizzah tribe in this period, they were eventually defeated by an alliance of several tribes along with the Al Saud, who had reestablished their rule in Riyadh in 1823. A battle with an alliance led by the Mutayr and 'Ajman tribes in 1823, and another battle with the Subay' and the Al Saud in 1830, ended the rule of the Bani Khalid. The Ottomans appointed a governor from Bani Khalid over al-Hasa once more in 1874, but his rule was also short-lived.

== Present ==
Many clans and sections of the Bani Khalid had already settled in al-Hasa and Nejd by this time, but many of those who remained leaving east Arabia after their military defeats against Ibn Saud, eventually settled in Iraq, Lebanon and Palestine. The clan today consists of important rulers, and members of government. Many families from Bani Khalid can be found today in Iraq, Kuwait, Bahrain, Palestine, Lebanon, Saudi Arabia and Qatar.

== Notable members ==
- Rashid Khalidi (born 1948), Palestinian American historian of the Middle East; son of Ismail Khalidi
- Husayn al-Khalidi (1895–1962), mayor of Jerusalem (1934–1937)
- Mustafa al-Khalidi (died 1944), the last Palestinian-Arab mayor of Jerusalem (1938–1944)
- Wadha bint Muhammad Al Orair, mother of Prince Turki and King Saud
- Ahmed Juffali, Saudi businessman
- Salman al-Ouda, Saudi Muslim scholar
- Ibrahim bin Abdullah Al Suwaiyel, Saudi minister of foreign affairs and minister of environment, water and agriculture
- Anbara Salam Khalidi (1897–1986), Lebanese feminist, translator and author
- Yousef al-Khalidi (1829 or 1842–1906), mayor of Jerusalem (1899–1907)
- Walid Khalidi (born 1925), influential Palestinian historian; son of Ahmad Samih Khalidi, dean of the Arab College of Jerusalem
- Muhammad al-'Arifi (born 15 July 1970), Saudi Islamic scholar, author, and preacher. Influential figure in role in contemporary Islamic discourse.
- Hassan Al-Thawadi, Qatari lawyer who was the Secretary General at Supreme Committee for Delivery and Legacy for the 2022 FIFA World Cup Qatar Local Organizing Committee
