= Tahir al-Jazairi =

Syrian Muslim scholar and educator (1852–1920)

Shaykh Ṭāhir al-Jazāʿiri
- طاهر الجزائري
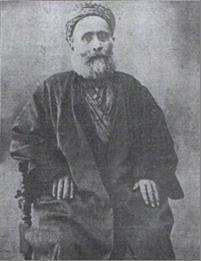

Personal life
- Born: 1852 Damascus, Ottoman Syria
- Died: January 5, 1920 (aged 67–68) Damascus, Arab Kingdom of Syria

Religious life
- Religion: Islam
- Denomination: Sunni
- Creed: Athari
- Movement: Salafi

Muslim leader
- Students: Muḥammad Kurd ʿAlī, Muḥammad Saʿīd al-Bānī al-Dimashqī, Muḥibb ad-Dīn al-Khaṭīb

Tahir al-Jaza'iri (Arabic: طاهر الجزائري; 1852–1920) was a 19th century Syrian Muslim scholar and educational reformer and Islamic scholar.

== Biography ==
Tahir al-Jaza'iri (full name: Arabic: طاهر بن محمد صالح بن أحمد بن موهوب السمعوني الجزائري الدمشقي, romanized: Ṭāhir bin Muḥammad Ṣāliḥ bin Aḥmad bin Mawhūb al-Samʿūni al-Jazāʿirī al-Dimashqī) was born in 1852 in Damascus to an academic family of the Sam'un Amazigh tribe of Algeria. His father, Muhammad Salih, a mufti of the Maliki school of jurisprudence, had migrated from Algeria to Damascus in 1846.

Tahir studied with his father until the latter's death around 1868, after which he studied under Abd al-Ghani Al-Maydani, Abd ar-Rahman al-Bustani, and Abd ar-Rahman al-Bushnaqi at the Madrasa al-Jaqmaqiyya next to the Umayyad Mosque.

Tahir al-Jazairi was interested in Arabic and in Arabic literature, particularly old manuscripts. His mastery of Persian was comparable to his mastery of Arabic, and he was also proficient in Ottoman Turkish. He also studied French, Hebrew, Syriac, Ethiopian, several ancient Semitic languages, and Tamazight, though he did not master these.

At the age of 22, he started teaching at al-Madrasa al-Zahiriyeh in Damascus. Under the reforms of the governor Midhat Pasha, al-Jazairi became inspector of education. According to Muḥammad Kurd ʿAlī, al-Jazairi also designed curricula for elementary education and wrote the necessary textbooks, in topics including Arabic grammar, ethics, religion, and history. Under Midhat Pasha, al-Jazairi also founded Dar al-Kutub az-Zahiriyah, the library of the Az-Zahiriyah, with manuscripts he collected from around Damascus. He then established Khalidi Library in Jerusalem in the name of Sheikh Raghib al-Khalidi of the Khalidi family. He associated with intellectuals such as Jamal al-Din Qasimi, Abd ar-Razzāq al-Baytar, and Salim al-Bukhari.

In 1902 he was dismissed from his position as inspector of libraries. Under continued pressure from Ottoman authorities, he left for Cairo in 1905 where he associated with Ahmad Zaki Pasha and Ahmed Taymour Pasha. In Cairo he supported himself as a book merchant, dealing in valuable manuscripts. He remained in Cairo for about thirteen years and in 1920 he became seriously ill, and he returned to Damascus. One of his pupils during this period was Muhib al-Din al-Khatib who would be a significant figure for the Salafi movement in Egypt. Soon after his return he was elected as a member of the Arabic Academy in Damascus and the Director of the Ẓāhirīyyah Library. He died four months later in 1920 and was buried on the Qāsiyūn Mountain in Damascus, Syria.

== Works ==
Shaykh Ṭāhir wrote over 35 books. His most important books are listed below.

=== Islamic sciences ===
- Al-Tibyān li-Baʿḍ al-Mabāḥith al-Mutaʿalliqah bi ‘l-Qur’ān (Arabic: التبيان لبعض المباحث المتعلقة بالقرآن) in the Quranic sciences.
- Tawjīh al-Naẓar ilā Uṣūl al-Athar (Arabic: توجيه النظر في أصول الأثر) in the science of Ḥadīth. Shaykh Abd al-Fattah Abu Ghudda describes this as one of the most extensive works on the subject.
- Al-Jawāhir al-Kalāmīyyah fī al-ʿAqā’id al-Islāmīyyah (Arabic: الجواهر الكلامية في إيضاح العقائد الإسلامية) in ʿAqīdah (Islamic theology).

=== Arabic language ===
- Irshād al-Albā ilā Tarīq Taʿlīm Alif Bā (Arabic: إرشاد الألباء إلى طريق تعليم ألف باء) in teaching/learning the Arabic language at the primary-school level.
- Al-Taqrīb ilā Uṣūl al-Taʿrīb (Arabic: التقريب إلى أصول التعريب) in Arabic grammar.
- Mukhtaṣar Adab al-Kātib (Arabic: مختصر أدب الكاتب) – a summary of "Kitāb Adab al-Kātib by Ibn Qutaybah.

=== Poetry and literature ===
- Sharḥ Khuṭab Ibn Nabātah (Arabic: شرح خطب ابن نباتة).
- Munyat al-Adhkiyā fī Qaṣaṣ al-Anbiyā (Arabic: منية الأذكياء في قصص الأنبياء).
- مراقي علم الأدب
- تسهيل المجاز إلى فني المعمّى والألغاز
- التقريب إلى أصول التعريب
- روضة العقلاء لابن حبّان
- الأدب والمروءة لصالح بن جناح

=== Other topics ===
- Madkhal al-Ṭullāb ilā Fann al-Ḥisāb on mathematics education at the primary-school level.
- Al-Tadhkirah al-Ẓāhirīyyah – a collection of articles on various topics.
- Al-ʿUqūd al-Ālī fī Asānīd al-Awālī

Some of his works are still manuscripts that have never been published. Some of the titles are:

- Al-Ilmām bi Uṣūl Sīrat al-Nabī ʿAlayhi ‘l-Ṣalāt wa ‘l-Salām (Arabic: الإلمام بأصول سيرة النبي عليه الصلاة والسلام).
- Asnā ‘l-Maqāṣid fi ʿIlm al-ʿAqā’id.
- Selections from al-Muwāfaqāt by ash-Shāṭibī.
- Selections from az-Zarrūq’s work in Taṣawwuf.
