= Daniel Auster =

Israeli politician (1893–1962)

- דניאל אוסטר
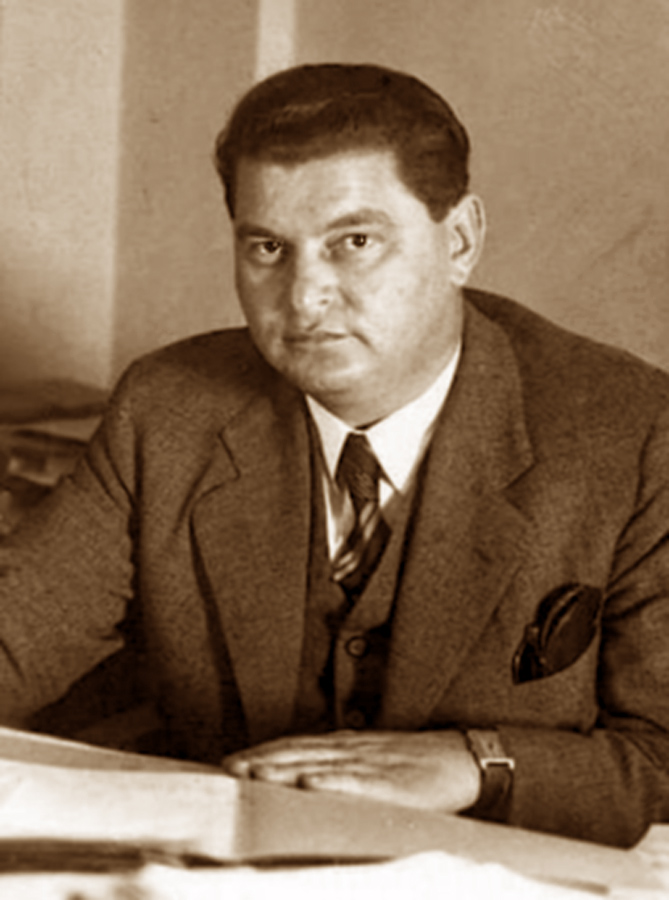

Mayor of West Jerusalem
- In office 1948–1950
- Succeeded by: Shlomo Zalman Shragai

Mayor of Jerusalem
- In office 1944–1948
- Preceded by: Mustafa al-Khalidi
- Succeeded by: Teddy Kollek (1967)
- In office 1937–1938
- Preceded by: Husayn al-Khalidi
- Succeeded by: Mustafa al-Khalidi

Personal details
- Born: 7 May 1893 Knihinin, Galicia, Austria-Hungary
- Died: 15 January 1963 (aged 69) Israel
- Party: General Zionists
- Spouse: Julia Auster

Daniel Auster OBE (Hebrew: דניאל אוסטר; 7 May 1893 – 15 January 1963) was Mayor of Jerusalem in the final years of Mandatory Palestine, the first Jewish mayor of the city, and the first mayor of Jerusalem after Israeli independence.

== Early life and education ==
Daniel Auster was born in Kniahynyn, a Galician town that is now a district of the city Ivano-Frankivsk, Ukraine. He immigrated to Ottoman-controlled Palestine prior to World War I after finishing his law studies at the university in Vienna, Austria, from which he graduated in 1914. He initially settled in Haifa and taught German at the Reali School.

== Career ==
The British High Commissioner appointed Auster as deputy mayor of Jerusalem in 1935. The government of Mandatory Palestine established two governments for Jerusalem in 1948, one for Arabs and the other for Jews. He was made mayor in 1948, with Reuven Shari as his deputy mayor.

In 1937, he became the first Jewish mayor of Jerusalem. He was also a member of the Assembly of Representatives for the General Zionists party and a signatory of the Israeli Declaration of Independence.

In November 1947, he was a member of the Jewish Agency's delegation to the Working Committee of the Trusteeship Council which attempted to draw up a Draft Statute for Jerusalem, but in 1949, he openly declared his opposition to the internationalization of Jerusalem and stated categorically that it was not possible. He contested the 1949 Knesset elections as the leader of the For the Sake of Jerusalem list, but only received 0.2% of the vote. He joined the Progressive Party in August 1950. In 1950, Auster lost reelection as mayor as the council voted 11 to 9 in favour of Shragai against him.

== Personal life ==
For his service, Auster was made an Officer of the Order of the British Empire by King George VI.

Writer Paul Auster is related to Auster.

== Works cited ==
=== Journals ===
- Weitz, Yechiam (2022). "Municipal Elections in the Holy City: Campaigns, Results, and Coalition Building in Jerusalem, 1948–1973". Israel Studies. 27 (3). Indiana University Press: 143–165. doi:10.2307/48683547. JSTOR 48683547.

=== News ===
- Ivry, Benjamin (2 May 2024). "How Jewish literature and activism shaped the work of Paul Auster". The Forward. Archived from the original on 6 November 2026.
