= Al-Khaldi =

Last name

Al-Khaldi (Arabic: الْخَالْدِي), also spelled Al Khalidi is the last name given to descendants of the Bani Khalid. The tribe traditionally claims descent from Khalid ibn al-Walid, a senior companion of the Islamic prophet Muhammad and esteemed general who was crucial in the Islamic Conquest of Persia and Syria. However, this claim has been questioned by Arab genealogists. The tribe has historically been powerful in the Arabian Peninsula, having ruled Southern Iraq, Kuwait, and Eastern Arabia after expelling Ottoman and Portuguese forces in 1670. After their conflict and fall to the Emirate of Diriyah, many Khalidis scattered to Iraq and the Levant, where many of them remain to this day. The Khalidis were reinstated in power by the Ottomans after the deposition of the first Saudi State in the early 19th century, but the Saudis would quickly rise again and permanently remove them from power. Today the overwhelming majority of the descendants of the tribe live in Saudi Arabia as well as Kuwait, Qatar, Oman, Lebanon, Iraq, Jordan, Syria, and Palestine and UAE also.

== History ==
=== Jabrid Emirate ===
Despite many claims that the Jabrid Emirate in the 14th and 15th centuries was ruled by the Bani Khalid, the Jabrid dynasty seems to be unrelated. The confusion may arise from the fact that the ruling clan of the Bani Khalid were also known as the Banu Jabr, and also may have descended from the Banu Uqayl like the Jabrids; as well as the fact that both dynasties ruled the same region, yet there are no contemporary sources labelling the Jabrids as Khalidis.

=== First Khalidi Emirate ===
The chieftainship of the Bani Khalid has traditionally been held by the clan of Al Humaid from the Banu Jabr section of the Khalidis. The Bani Khalid dominated the deserts surrounding the Al-Hasa and Al-Qatif during the 15th and 18th centuries. Under Barrak ibn Ghurayr of the Al Humaid, the Bani Khalid were able to expel Ottoman garrisons from the cities and towns of Eastern Arabia as well as the encroaching Portuguese who had built many fortified trade posts.

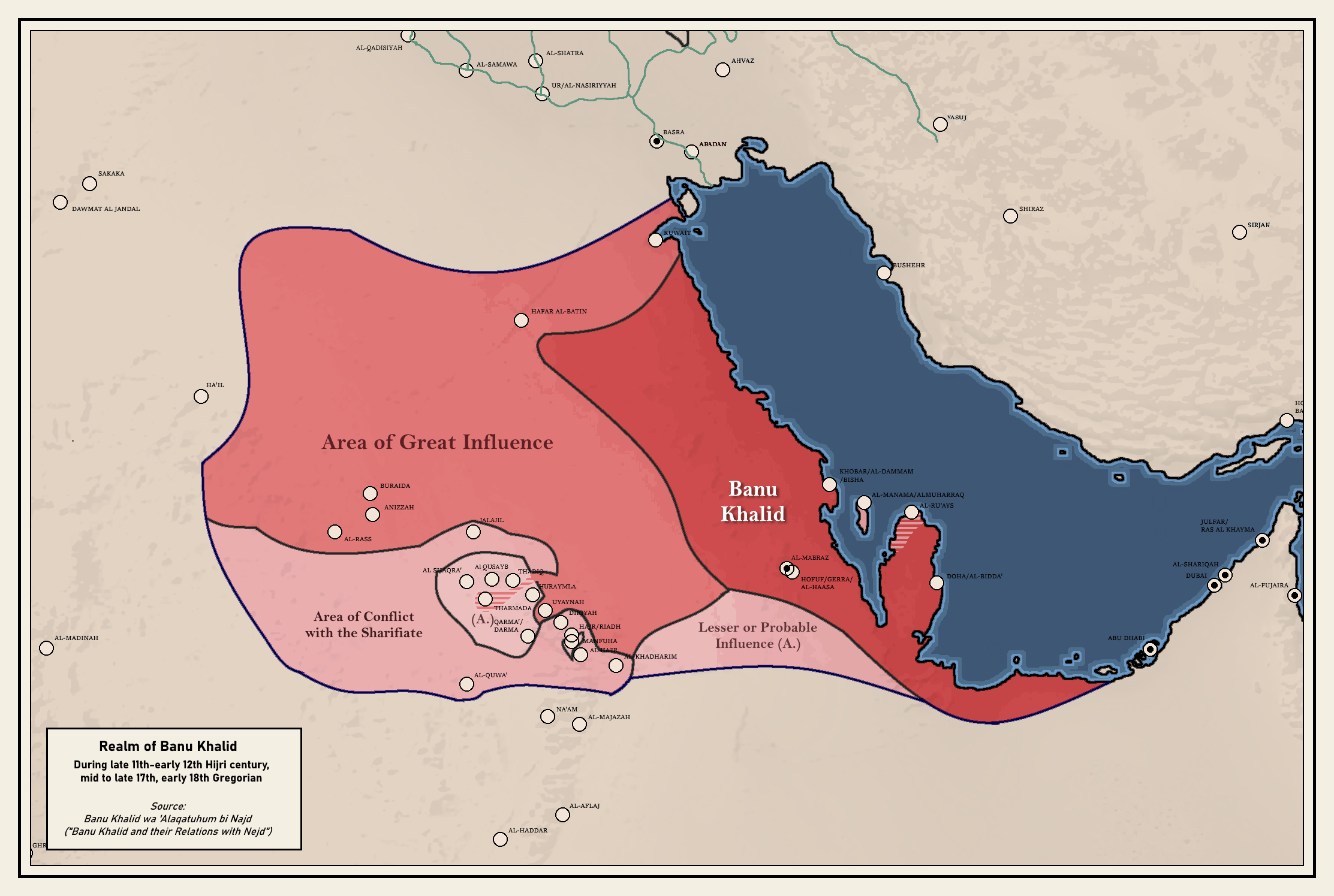
Territorial dominance of the Khalidi Emirate

In 1670 they proclaimed their rule over the region. Ibn Ghurayr made his capital in Al-Mubarraz near Al-Ahsa, where remnants of his castle stand today. According to Arabian folklore, one chief of the Bani Khalid attempted to protect the prized desert bustard (Habari) from extinction by prohibiting the bedouin in his realm from poaching the bird's eggs, earning the tribe the appellation of "protectors of the eggs of the Habari", an allusion to the chief's absolute supremacy over his realm.

=== Fall to the Saudis ===
The Bani Khalid of eastern Arabia maintained ties with members of their tribe who had settled in Nejd during their earlier migration eastwards, and also cultivated clients among the rulers of the Najdi towns, such as Al Mu'ammar of al-Uyayna. When the emir of Uyayna adopted the ideas of Muhammad ibn Abd al-Wahhab, as the Khalidis were strong proponents of the Maliki Madhab and opposed to the new Wahhabi ideology, the Khalidi chief ordered him to cease support for Ibn Abd al-Wahhab and to expel him from his town. The emir agreed, and Ibn Abd al-Wahhab moved to neighboring Dir'iyyah, where he joined forces with Al Saud. The Bani Khalid remained staunch enemies of the Saudis and their allies and attempted to invade Nejd and Diriyyah in an effort to stop Saudi expansion. Their efforts failed, however, and after conquering Nejd, the Saudis invaded the Bani Khalid's domain in al-Hasa and deposed Al 'Ura'yir in 1793. In the early 1950s, many Al Arabi people originating from Iraq migrated to Saudi Arabia Al Qassim.

=== Return and fall from power ===
When the Ottomans invaded Arabia and overthrew Al Saud in 1818, they conquered al-Hasa and al-Qatif, and reinstated members of Al 'Uray'ir as rulers of the region. The Bani Khalid were no longer the potent military force they once were at this time, and tribes such as the Ajman, the Dawasir, Subay' and Mutayr began encroaching on the Bani Khalid's desert territories. They were also beset by internal quarrels over leadership. Though the Bani Khalid were able to forge an alliance with the 'Anizzah tribe in this period, they were eventually defeated by an alliance of several tribes along with Al Saud, who had reestablished their rule in Riyadh in 1823. A battle with an alliance led by the Mutayr and 'Ajman tribes in 1823, and another battle with the Subay' and Al Saud in 1830, brought the rule of the Bani Khalid to a close. The Ottomans appointed a governor from Bani Khalid over al-Hasa once more in 1874, but his rule was also short-lived.

=== Khalidis of Jerusalem ===
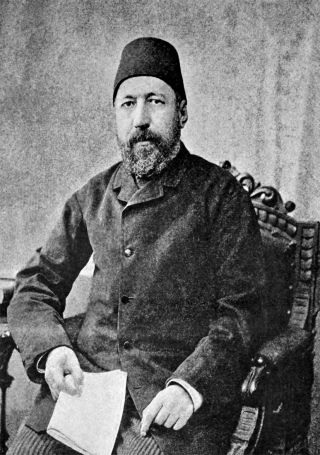
Yousef al-Khalidi, mayor of Jerusalem

The Khalidis of Jerusalem rose to prominence during Mamluk rule. They became one of the most powerful families in Palestine, rivaled by the equally powerful Husayni clan as well as the Nashashibis. The Khalidi family held the banner of the Qaysi faction in Jerusalem while the Husaynis held the banner of the Yamanis. After the fall of Egypt and the Levant to the Ottomans, the Khalidis grew in power, with many of them holding key offices.

After the Tanzimat reforms were completed, the Ottoman Empire adopted a new government type, modeled on that of the average European nation. In accordance with the Ottoman Constitution of 1876, which had turned the Ottoman Empire into a constitutional monarchy, it now had a parliament with representatives from every province. Yusuf Dia-Uddin Pasha Al Khalidi was the representative of Jerusalem in the parliament, and was also the mayor of Jerusalem from 1870 to 1876 and 1878 to 1879. Yusuf Dia Pasha had studied in Malta and learned English and French. He received a letter from Zadok Kahn Chief Rabbi of France, calling him to the Zionist cause. He replied with a letter: "In the Name of God, Leave Palestine Alone." When Zadok Kahn showed the letter to Theodor Herzl, the founder of political Zionism, Herzl replied: "If we are not wanted in Palestine, we will search and we will find elsewhere what we seek."

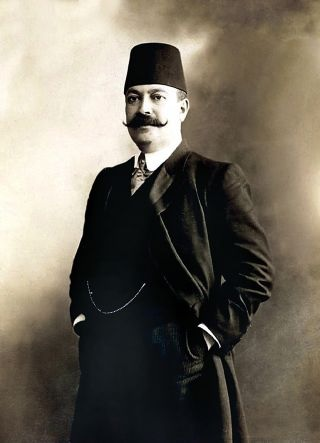
Ruhi al-Khalidi

Yusuf Dia Pasha's nephew Ruhi al Khalidi was the mayor of Jerusalem from 1899 to 1907 and deputy to the head of parliament in 1911; he wrote extensively on early Zionism and the threats they posed; and was known to be very cross with the ruling political party, the Ittihad ve Terraki, for their lack of seriousness with dealing with the Zionist threat. His rising political career ended with his death from typhoid in 1913. Both Yusuf and Ruhi were part of the Ittihad ve Terraki, a right wing party believing in Ottoman Islamist Nationalism, as opposed to their Husseini rivals who were Arab Nationalists.

After the collapse of the Ottomans in WW1 due to the Great Arab Revolt, a British Mandate was set up in Palestine, charged with modernizing Palestine and granting it independence when it was "ready" as well as to "secure the establishment of the Jewish national home" . This time period was marked by Arab Nationalists strengthening their regime under the Grand Mufti of Jerusalem Amin al-Husseini. Due to the Khaldis opposition to nationalism, they had difficult time getting back into politics, with the exceptions of Hussein al-Khalidi who was mayor from 1934 to 1937, and Mustafa al-Khalidi who was the last Arab Mayor of Jerusalem from 1938 to 1944. When Mustafa was accused of Zionism, like his relatives, he replied by saying,"We must recognise the facts; the Zionists have migrated to this country, become citizens, have become Palestinians, and they cannot be thrown into the sea. Likewise, some of them have bought land and received deeds in exchange for money and we must recognize them. There is no point in closing our eyes about such things". After the creation of the State of Israel, most Arab countries had turned into monarchies, meaning ascension into the political system was no easy task. Hussein al-Khalidi had managed to be appointed Prime Minister of Jordan. His cabinet was rejected multiple times, however, and he was forced to give up the position. His memoirs, "An Era of Courtesies Went On", were published by the Khalidi Library in Jerusalem. Descendants of the Jerusalemite branch have become highly influential academics. Walid Khalidi was a professor of history at Oxford University. The nephew of Hussein al-Khalidi, Rashid Khalidi, is a professor at Columbia University and has written extensively on the Palestinian Exodus.

The Khalidis of Jerusalem established the famous Khalidi Library near Al-Aqsa Mosque, which is open till this day.

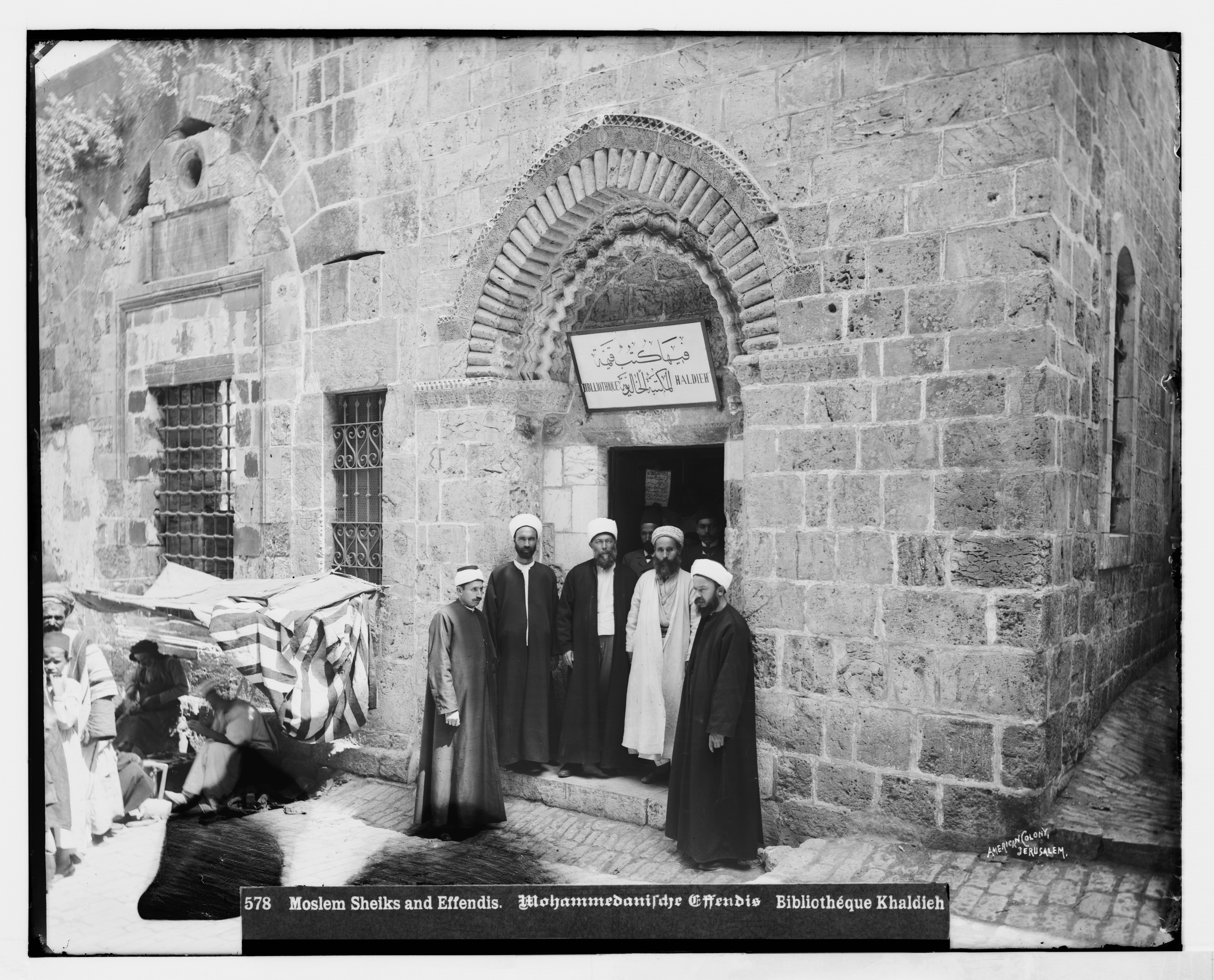
Khalidi Library, from the opening ca. 1900. From right: Hajji Raghib Al-Khalidi, Sheikh Taher al Jaza’ireh (from Damascus), Sheikh Musa Shafiq Al-Khalidi, Sheikh Khalil Al-Khalidi, Sheikh Muhammad Al-Habbal (from Beirut)

== Notable members ==
- Anbara Salam Khalidi (1897–1986), Lebanese feminist, translator and author, married to Palestinian educator, Ahmad Samih Al Khalidi
  - Walid Khalidi (1925–2026), influential Palestinian historian; son of Ahmad Samih Khalidi, dean of the Arab College of Jerusalem
  - Tarif Khalidi (born 1938), Palestinian historian, professor at the American University of Beirut; brother of Walid and cousin of Rashid Khalidi
- Husayn al-Khalidi (1895–1962), mayor of Jerusalem from 1934 to 1937
- Ismail Khalidi (1916–1968), political scientist and senior UN officer
  - Rashid Khalidi (born 1948), Palestinian American historian of the Middle East; son of Ismail Khalidi
    - Mona Khalidi, senior employee at Columbia University and Palestinian activist; wife of Rashid Khalidi
    - Ismail Khalidi (writer) (born 1982), Palestinian American playwright, poet, director and actor; son of Rashid and Mona Khalidi
- Yousef al-Khalidi (1829 or 1842–1906), mayor of Jerusalem from 1899 to 1907
  - Ruhi Khalidi (1864–1913), writer, teacher, activist and Ottoman politician; nephew of Yousef al-Khalidi
- Mustafa al-Khalidi (died 1944), the last Palestinian-Arab mayor of Jerusalem from 1938 to 1944
- Ghazwa Al-Khalidi (1943–2025), Iraqi actress

== See also ==
- Khalidi Library in Jerusalem
- al-Husayni, Jerusalemite adversaries of the Khalidis
- Wadha bint Muhammad Al Orair, Khalidi princess, mother of Prince Turki and King Saud
- Ahmed Juffali, Saudi businessman from the Bani Khalid
- Salman al-Ouda, Saudi Muslim scholar from the Bani Khalid
- Ibrahim bin Abdullah Al Suwaiyel, Saudi Minister of Foreign Affairs and Minister of Environment, Water and Agriculture from the Bani Khalid.
