= Al-Budeiri Library =

Library in Jerusalem

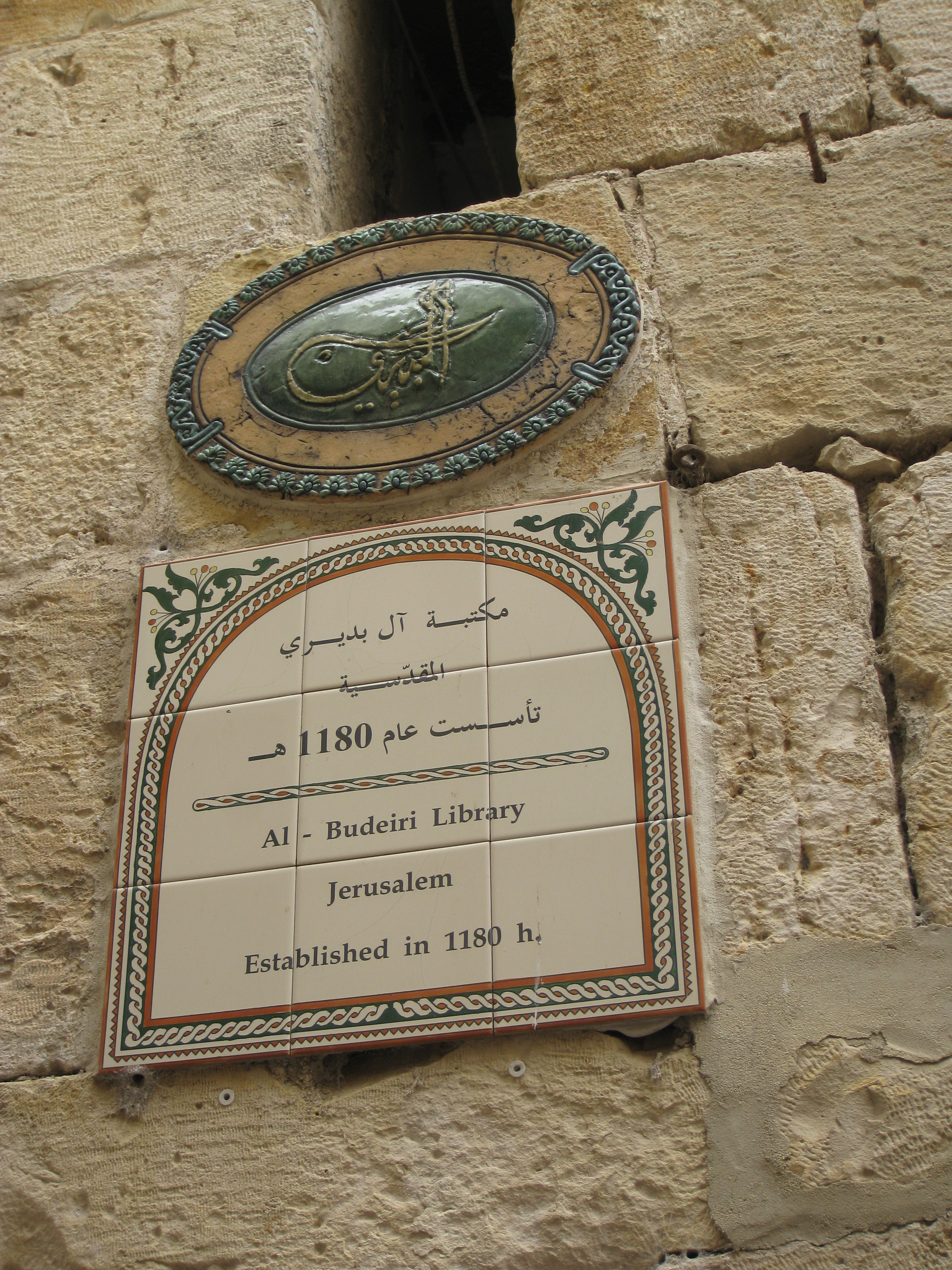
Al-Budeiri Library

Al-Budeiri Library (Arabic: مكتبة العائلة البديرية, romanized: Maktabat al-ʿĀʾila al-Budayriyya) is a small private library and archive located in the Old City of Jerusalem. Its collection includes some 900 manuscripts, dating from as early as the 12th century C.E. The library began as the personal collection of the Jerusalemite sharif, Sheikh Mohammad Ibn Budeir Ibn Mohammad Ibn Mahmud Ibn Hubaysh, also known as Ibn al-Hubaysh or Sheikh Budeir (1747–1805). Today, like many of Jerusalem's old family libraries, al-Budeiri seeks to increase scholarly access and awareness of its valuable collection of historical documents through partnerships with international cultural heritage organizations.

== History ==
Al-Budeiri Library sprung from the personal library of an 18th-century Sufi scholar, Sheikh Mohamed Ibn Budeir al-Budeiri, a man of faith and knowledge who came from a noble family (originally from Hijaz) that lived in the Old City of Jerusalem for nine hundred years, he studied at al-Azhar. He also inherited lots of properties from his father and bought many others on his own which shows the great inherited wealth of al-Budeiri and the honorable family status in Jerusalem. Sheikh Mohamed Ibn Budeir began collecting manuscripts at age 15, and he continually added to his library until his death in 1805. For a long period prior to 2003, the library was shuttered and neglected. The Budeiri family renovated with family members fund and re-opened the library in 2003. Since then, the library acquired and repaired an additional 520 manuscripts, solicited mainly from members of the extended Budeiri family. Al-Budeiri Library continues to operate out of the home of Sheikh Mohamed Ibn Budeir al-Budeiri, as specified in his will. The library is open to the public by appointment.

Since late 2008, al-Budeiri's collection has been undergoing preservation and digitization as part of the Manumed Project, itself under the auspices of a collaborative partnership between the European Union-funded program, Euromed Heritage IV, and its local partner, the Arab Studies Society. The collection is now digitized and available for viewing on the website of the Hill Museum & Manuscript Library.

== Collection ==
Al-Budeiri Library's collection includes approximately 900 manuscripts from as early as the 12th century C.E., as well as dozens of printed books from the 20th century, and a host of documents related to the history of the Al-Budeiri family, including diaries, personal correspondence, and legal documents dating to the late Ottoman period. The bulk of the manuscript collection is written in Arabic, though there are a few in Ottoman Turkish and Persian. A catalog of the library's manuscript holdings was published in 1987; however this does not include the hundreds of manuscripts acquired since the library's post-2003 revitalization. The 636 manuscripts recorded in the 1987 catalog were copied onto 35 mm microfilm. The library management embarked on the creation of a new comprehensive catalog in spring of 2010, concluding work on the draft catalog in January 2011. According to the Palestinian American Research Center, roughly half of the library's manuscripts are well-preserved, with another quarter needing only rebinding, and the remainder in total or partial disrepair.

According to the Manumed Project website, Al-Budeiri's manuscript collection includes six unique manuscripts−(meaning that there are no other known copies of the work). The collection also includes 18 manuscripts copied by Sheikh Mohamed Ibn Budeir himself. The oldest manuscript in the collection, "The Qasheiri Message," was composed in 1167 C.E. The subject matter of the manuscript collection leans heavily towards Islamic religion, the Qu'ranic sciences, and Sufism.

As part of the Manumed Project, 900 manuscripts were digitized. The files and metadata were to be hosted on an online platform developed by the Manumed Project, called the Arabic Manuscripts Digital Library of Jerusalem, as announced by Christopher Graz, project manager of Euromed Heritage IV's regional monitoring and support unit, in June 2012. However, as of January 2015 the Arabic Manuscripts Digital Library of Jerusalem still does not exist; instead the files and metadata of al-Budeiri's digitized manuscript collection are accessible through Manumed's Digital Library of the Mediterranean Sea.

== See also ==
- Issaf Nashashibi Center for Culture and Literature
- Al-Aqsa Library
- Khalidi Library
