= Issaf Nashashibi Center for Culture and Literature =

Library, archive and cultural center in Jerusalem

- 31.793040867072857°N 35.23177964958268°E
- Location: Jerusalem
- Established: 1982

Other information
- Website: https://dartifl.org/en/%d8%af%d8%a7%d8%b1-%d8%a7%d8%b3%d8%b9%d8%a7%d9%81-%d8%a7%d9%84%d9%86%d8%b4%d8%a7%d8%b4%d9%8a%d8%a8%d9%8a-%d9%84%d9%84%d8%ab%d9%82%d8%a7%d9%81%d8%a9-%d9%88%d8%a7%d9%84%d9%81%d9%86%d9%88%d9%86-%d9%88/

The Issaf Nashashibi Center for Culture and Literature (Arabic: مكتبة دار إسعاف النشاشيبي) is a library, archive, and cultural center in East Jerusalem. Its collection includes over 800 manuscripts in Arabic, Ottoman Turkish, and Persian; the oldest of which dates to the 12th century C.E. The institution was established in 1982 to serve primarily as a research library. In 1997, the institution reevaluated its mission to focus on promoting Palestinian literary heritage by engaging students in East Jerusalem and hosting cultural events for the local community.

== History ==
The institution was organized largely by Ishaq al-Husayni, a scholar and member of the prominent al-Husayni family. Husayni partnered with the Dar Al-Tifl al-Arabi Institution to establish a research library and manuscript archive in the former mansion of Palestinian literary scholar, Issaf Nashashibi, in 1982. Restrictions on movement in and among Jerusalem, Israel, the West Bank, Gaza, and neighboring countries in which several million Palestinians reside, have severely limited scholarly access to the center's collection. These impediments to access spurred the center to reevaluate its mission in 1997. Attempting to be, first and foremost, a resource for scholars of Palestinian history, was deemed unfeasible considering the restrictions on movement and access. Today, the Center focuses on promoting Palestinian cultural heritage through events such as poetry readings and lectures aimed at engaging the population which has physical access to the Center—primarily residents of East Jerusalem.

== Collection ==
The bulk of the Isaaf Nashashibi Center's collection was donated by the al-Husayni family. The late Ishaq al-Husayni solicited the remainder of the collection from the personal libraries of other prominent Jerusalem families. Today the collection includes several thousand printed books, approximately 800 manuscripts, and a collection of local newspapers dating back to 1967. The printed books cover Islamic religion, history, and Arabic language literature. The Center lacks an online catalog of its print books.

The majority of the manuscripts are in Arabic; 30 titles are written in Ottoman Turkish or Persian. According to the center's chief archivist Basheer Barakat, as reported to the Palestinian American Research Center, the topics of the manuscripts can be categorized as follows: 500 titles on Islamic religion and Qu'ranic sciences, approximately 140 titles on Arabic literature, approximately 60 titles on the sciences, approximately 40 titles on history, and 6 titles on miscellaneous topics. The manuscripts are reportedly in good condition, though they could greatly benefit from modern preservation practices. The manuscript collection has been copied onto 16 mm microfilm.

== Catalogues ==
- Barakat, Basheer. Catalog of Manuscripts of Is'af al-Nashashibi Library. (Jerusalem, 2002, Vol. 2.)

== See also ==
- Al-Budeiri Library
- Al-Aqsa Library
- Khalidi Library
