= Al-Aqsa Library =

Library in Al-Aqsa, Jerusalem

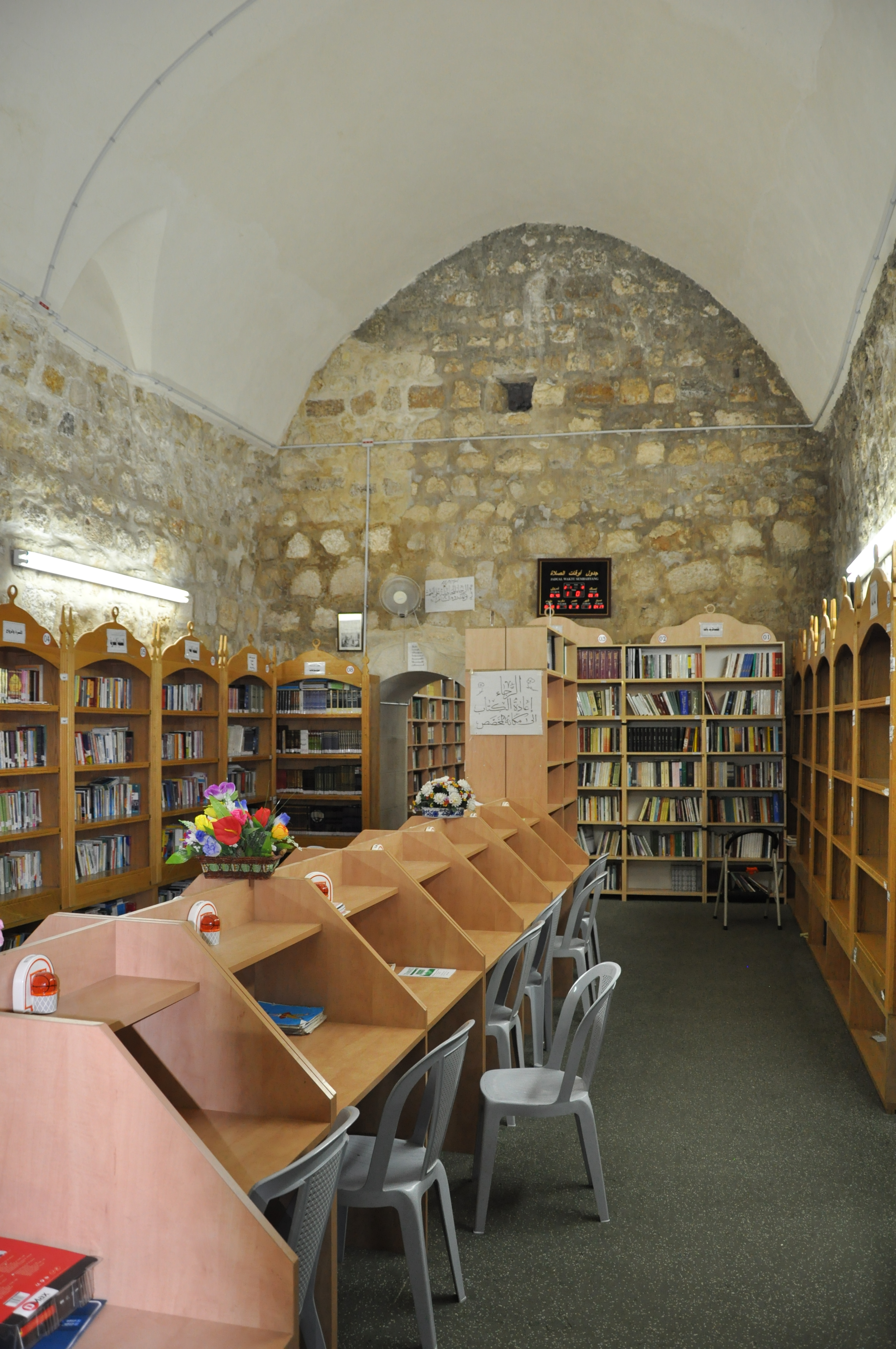
Interior of al-Khutniyya Library, part of the al-Aqsa Library system

The al-Aqsa Library (مكتبة الأقصى Maktabat al-ʾAqṣā), also known as the al-Aqsa Mosque Library (مكتبة المسجد الأقصى Maktabat al-Masjid al-ʾAqṣā), is the assemblage of books in the Al-Aqsa mosque compound (al-Ḥaram ash-Sharīf) in Jerusalem.

== Locations ==
The library has two components:

- The main library: west of al-Aqsa Mosque (al-Qibli).
- The al-Khutniyya Library: south of al-Aqsa Mosque.

Both locations are only accessible from within the compound.

=== Main library ===
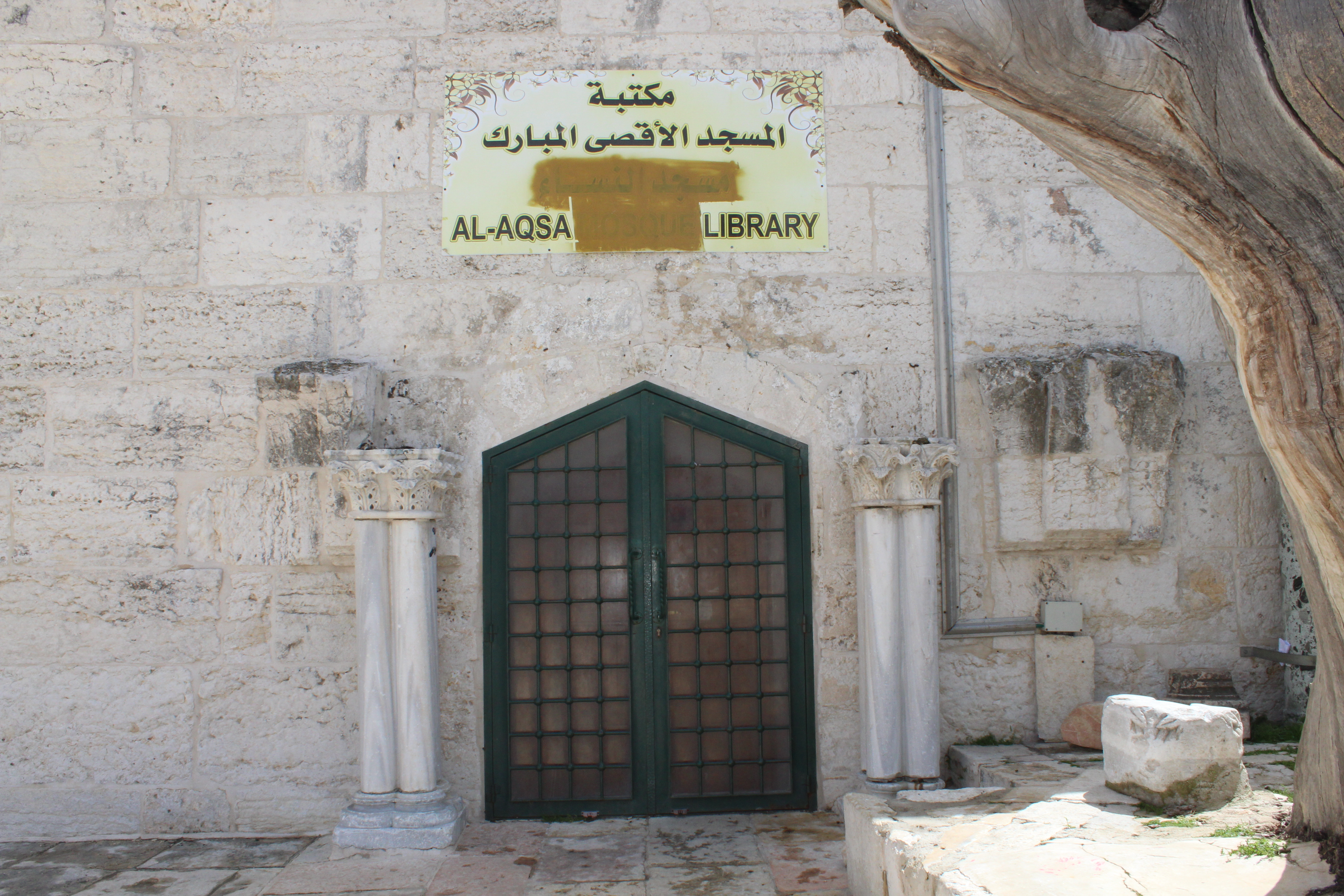
The main library in a plaza between al-Aqsa Mosque (al-Qibli) and the Islamic Museum

The main al-Aqsa library is a general library. It is in a building immediately west of al-Aqsa Mosque (al-Qibli Mosque), inside the compound's south wall. This structure went by many names:

- the "White Mosque" and al-baqʿa al-bayḍa (البقعة البيضا, lit. 'the white place') because of its stones' color.
- the "Women’s Mosque" (جامع النساء Jāmiʿ an-Nisāʾ), muṣallan an-nisāʾ (مصلى النساء "women's musalla") and "women's hall" because of its former use by women.
- the "Templars' Armory", because of its use before c. 1193 as a hall or monastic quarters or refectory or armory by the Templars, who might have it constructed in the 1160s. After 1193 (during the Ayyubid dynasty), a mihrab was installed in the south wall.
- the "mosque of Abu Bekr" (Jāmiʿ Abū Bakr): possibly a misnomer by 19th-century Europeans.

Its entrance faces the courtyard with the Dome of Yusuf Agha. To its west is the southern section of the Islamic Museum and the al-Fakhariyya Minaret.

In 1922, the Supreme Muslim Council established the dār Kutub al-Masjid al-ʾAqṣā (al-Aqsa Mosque's House of Books, دار كتب المسجد الأقصى المبارك). In 1923, books dispersed throughout the compound were gathered in the an-Naḥawiyya Dome. After inactivity from 1948 to 1976, the library was revived in 1977; books were moved from the Islamic Museum to the Ashrafiyya Madrasa, and then in 2000 to the Women's Mosque.

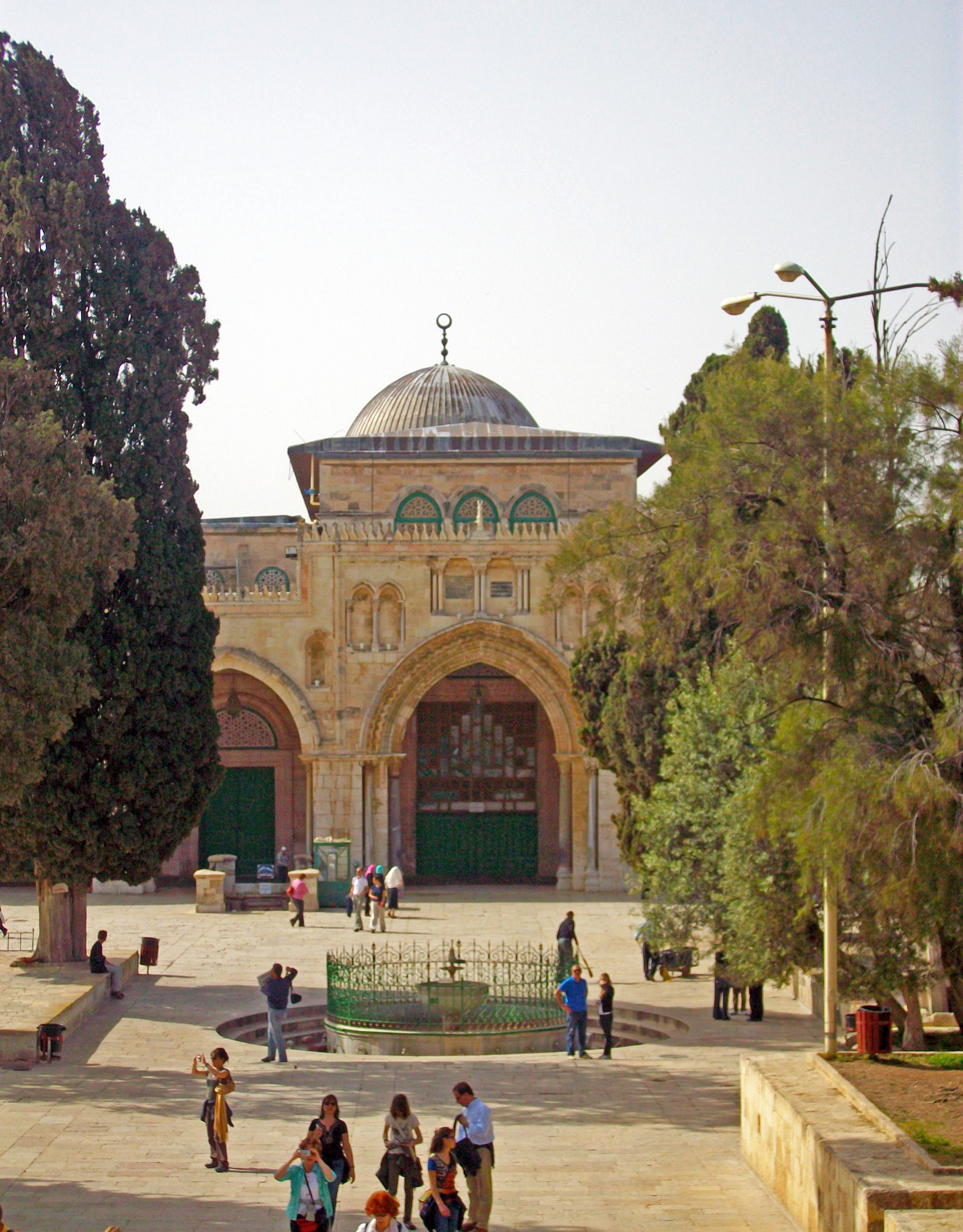
Tunnel to al-Khutniyya in front of al-Aqsa Mosque (al-Qibli)

=== Al-Khutniyya Library ===
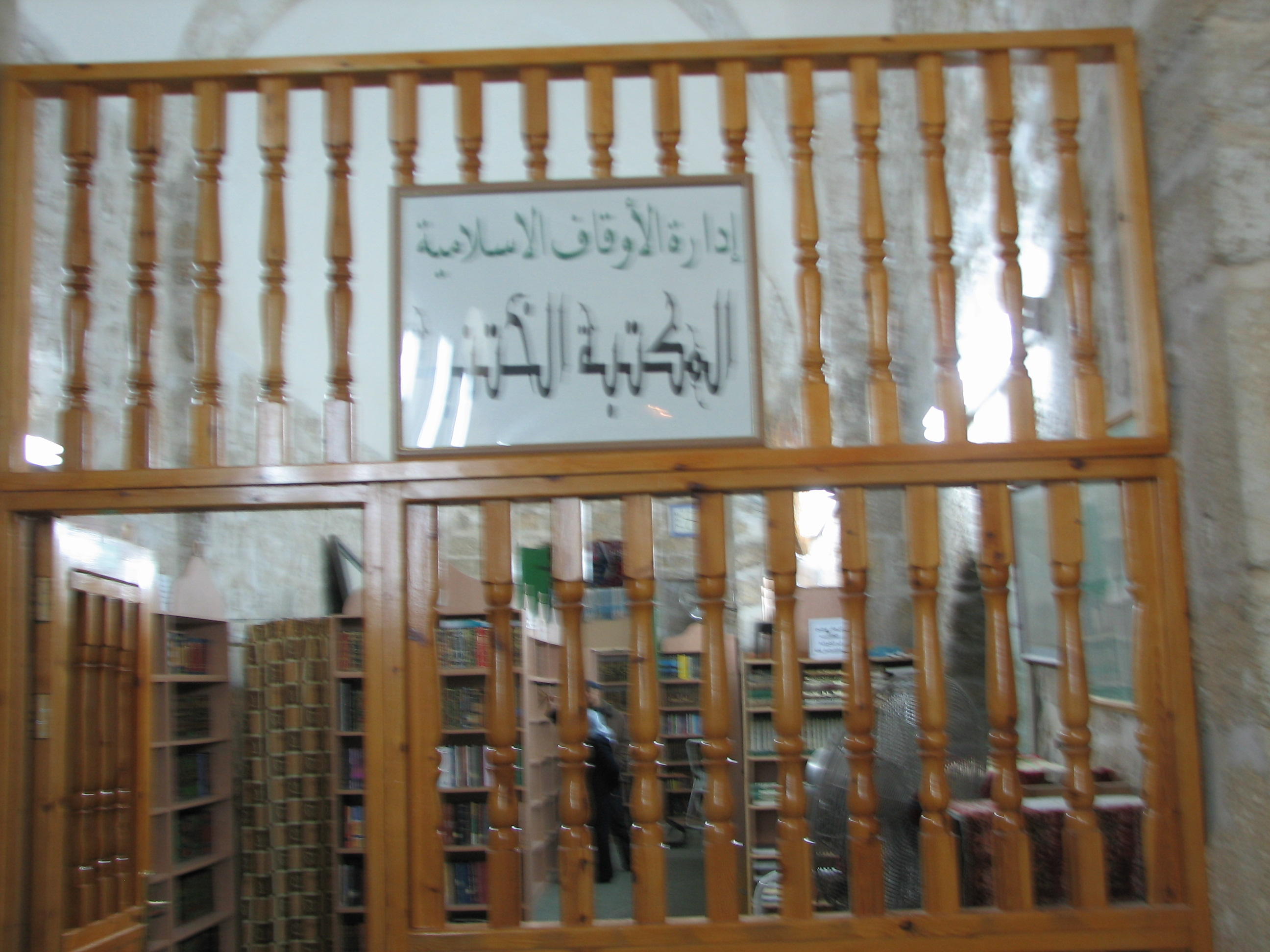
Door of al-Khutniyya underground

The al-Khutniyya Library (also al-Khutaniyya and al-Khataniyya) (مكتبة الختنية) is a manuscript library. It shares its name with a former zawiya and madrasa, which was named after a scholar, Sheikh al-Khutnī/al-Khatanī (الختني). (Not to be confused with the Khātūniyya, north of the Cotton Merchants' Gate.)

It is inside Old al-Aqsa in the remains of the Fatimid-era fortification tower on top of the now-sealed Double Gate. The library is in a salient (wall projection) attached to the compound's south wall, at 31°46′32.7″N 35°14′8.8″E. Its access is via a tunnel under the al-Aqsa Mosque (al-Qibli Mosque). The tunnel's only entryway/exit is before the mosque's portico, facing north.

This library began in 1998 as the initiative of a mosque volunteer, Marwan Nashashibi (1934-2014), and his wife, Um Adnan. Its collection has texts on jurisprudence, hadiths, hagiography, Sufism and other topics.

== Services ==
Its director (chief librarian) is often also the director (head curator) of the Islamic Museum.

It has about 20,000 books, notably on Islamic archaeology. Books are mostly in Arabic and English, with some in French. It has about 2,000 titles of Arabic manuscripts, from the 5th century to the Ottoman period. Only researchers have access to the manuscripts. It also has a large number of Palestinian newspapers and magazines, many dating to the early 20th century.

It has a department dedicated to children and youths in the main library.

== See also ==
- Ashrafiyya Madrasa (the al-Aqsa Center for the Restoration of Islamic Manuscripts)
- Other Palestinian libraries in the area:
  - Issaf Nashashibi Center for Culture and Literature
  - Khalidi Library
  - Al-Budeiri Library
