= Muhammad Kurd Ali =

Syrian historian

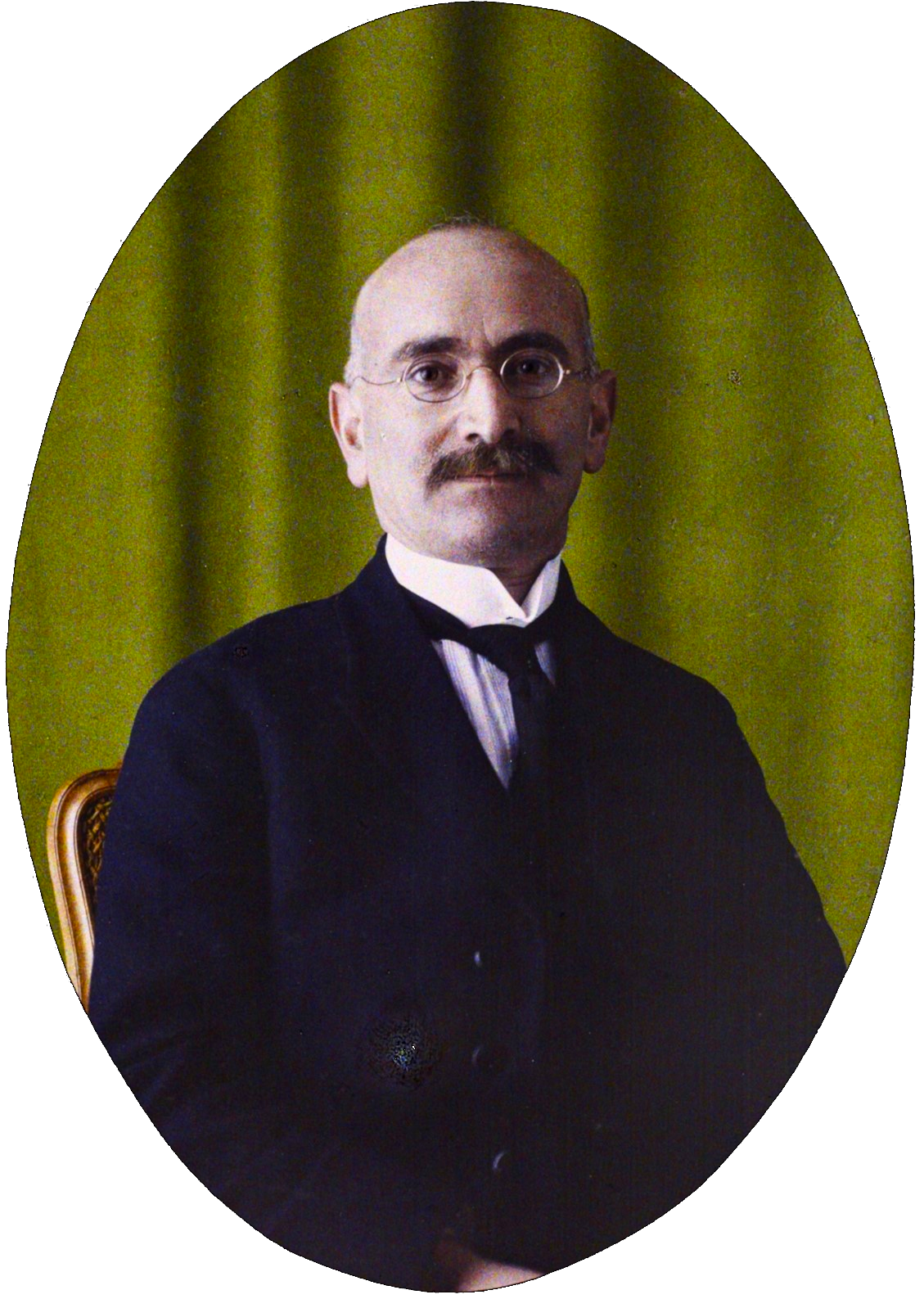
Autochrome portrait by Georges Chevalier, 1921

Muhammad Kurd Ali (Arabic: محمد كرد علي, 1876–1953) was a notable Syrian scholar, historian and literary critic in the Arabic language. He was the founder and director of the Academy of the Arabic Language in Damascus (1918) till his death.

== Early life ==
Muhammad Kurd ‛Ali's grandfather was a Kurd born in Sulaymaniyah in Kurdistan and came to Damascus in the early nineteenth century. His mother was Circassian.

Kurd ‛Ali learned to read and write in the kuttab where he also studied the Koran. He received his preparatory education at Al-Rushdiyya school, and then completed his secondary education at the Azariyya School.

In secondary school he recalled that on the first day he was asked what neighborhood he was from, as the custom was to call students by their first name and the name of their neighborhood as last name. Hailing as he did from Zuqaq Burghul (Bulgur Alley), by this logic he would have for the rest of his schooling been linked to dried cracked wheat. Thus he lied, and told his teacher that he hailed from the neighborhood of Tadil, which he was familiar with since that is where his father had lived as a boy.

Muhammad Kurd ‛Ali loved writing and journalism and developed an early interest in reading books and collecting them since childhood. Although illiterate himself, his father encouraged him to acquire books, and gave him sufficient assistance to possess them. As Kurd 'Ali developed more skill in science and language, he started to read newspapers and magazines in French, Turkish and Arabic. At the age of sixteen, he was writing news articles and was paid by newspapers. His vocation did not stop at this point, he loved Arabic poetry and rhyme rhetoric; and he kept close company with well-known local senior scholars at the time, drawing on their knowledge and literature, such as: Saleem Bukhari, Sheikh Mohammed Al Mubarak, and Sheikh Tahir al-Jazairi.

== Career in writing ==
In 1897, he was entrusted with editing the government weekly newspaper (Sham); he kept this job for three years and was committed in his articles to assonance. Then Kurd 'Ali started corresponding with Al-Muqtataf (excerpt) magazine in Egypt for five years through which his fame spread into Egypt.

Kurd 'Ali afterwards left for Cairo and remained there for ten months during which he worked as the editor of Al-Ra’ed Almasri (the Egyptian pioneer) newspaper. While there, he was introduced to many scientists, literary men and thinkers, which further broadened his horizon and increased his fame so much so that his name in Egypt became no less known than the most famous writers and the very best scholars of that time.

He returned to Damascus only to find himself a victim of a slander that lead to orders by the Turk ruler to have Kurd 'Ali's house searched, but he was later found innocent. Following this incident, Kurd 'Ali emigrated to Egypt in 1906 and established the monthly Al-Muqtabas (quoted) magazine where he published scientific, literary and historical research; he also edited another two daily newspapers: Al-Muqtabas and Al-Mu’ayyad. Citing from Western magazines, he used to report the latest news on science, civilization, invention and development; in addition to that, he translated a number of rare manuscripts. His work, therefore, was dedicated to the spreading of knowledge, both old and new.

Kurd Ali was also noted for writing anti-Shia polemics.

== In Politics ==
Muhammad Kurd 'Ali returned to Damascus in 1908 after the pronouncement of the Ottoman Constitution, and published the Al-Muqtabas magazine in addition to another daily newspaper he called Al-Muqtabas in collaboration with his brother Ahmed; he also founded its own press. But, under the Ottoman rule, he was subject to continuous harassment and restriction in the form of censorship and close monitoring of his writing and thinking; and as an example of that his newspaper was closed after one of the Turk rulers accused him of discussing the Sultan's family in one of his articles. Kurd 'Ali again fled to Egypt and then to Europe, but he returned later after he had been exonerated. These forms of harassment continued to haunt him until Kurd 'Ali finally handed the responsibility for the daily newspaper to his brother Ahmed and dedicated himself to the magazine. He became increasingly more apprehensive after the declaration of the First World War and the start of a revenge campaign by the Ottoman rulers against the ‘free Arabs’, who sought more political freedoms; so he closed the magazine and the newspaper. During this campaign Kurd 'Ali himself was almost driven to the gallows like many other freedom advocates and critics of the Ottoman regime; he was, however, spared thanks to a document found in the French consulate in Damascus written by a worker in the French Foreign Ministry before the war. According to the document, the French agent had approached Kurd 'Ali and, exploiting his dislike to the pro-Ottomans, he induced him to take a more positive approach towards the pro-French policy in the Middle East; but Kurd 'Ali's response was rather negative and he urged the French to alter their policy in Algeria and Tunisia. Similar documents like this included the 'official publication of confidentiality' that had been sent by the French ambassador in Istanbul to French consuls in Syria warning them from Kurd 'Ali and stating that: 'he only works with the Turks'. This came as a favourable evidence together with other papers of this kind found during the inspection of foreign consulates early in the war. Following this, Djemal Pasha summoned Kurd 'Ali and jubilantly informed him of this news but also warned him that should Kurd 'Ali turn to opposition again, Djamal Pasha threatened to kill him with his own pistol. He then ordered the newspaper to open again and gave Kurd 'Ali financial assistance; he then appointed him editor of Al-Sharq (the East) newspaper which was issued by the army.

After entering the Faisali Covenant and the independence of Syria from the Ottoman Empire, Kurd 'Ali found the opportunity to fulfill the dream that he had had for long: the establishment of an Arab Academy in Damascus in a similar manner like in other civilized nations with the aim of saving the Arabic heritage and protecting and developing the Arabic language as a vehicle for disseminating literature and sciences. So, he presented the idea to the military ruler then Rida Pasha al-Rikabi, who agreed to convert the Court of knowledge into an Academy of the Arabic Language in Damascus. This was achieved in the eighth of June 1919, and Muhammad Kurd 'Ali was appointed president of the Assembly and continued to be so until his death.

After the fall of the Ottoman Empire, the lands of Greater Syria, also known as Bilad al-Sham, were fragmented into different states and protectorates. Nevertheless, Kurd 'Ali remained a staunch advocate of the unity and independence of the region. The region, in his mind, was an important center which tied together three continents (i.e. Asia, Africa, and Europe) as well as the Arab World. Additionally, it was tied to the many religious communities it hosted. With Damascus as its capital, he envisioned an independent Greater Syria to be a "hub in and for the world," in the words of Cyrus Schayegh.

== Heritage ==
Kurd 'Ali cherished the Academy more than anything and looked at it as the one gift of his whole life and the fruit of all his strife so much so that he would not absent himself from any of the Academy's meetings. Mohammad Kurd 'Ali was a pioneer in journalism, and an authority on investigative journalism; he made a name for himself in writing and authorship and was one of the leading scholars in the Arab world. He is accredited as the first to establish high-quality newspaper and magazine in Damascus, and the first to establish an Arab Science Assembly in the Arab world.

The style of his writing has been described as ‘easy but impossible’. It is characterised with bland expression and verbal eloquence; and it uses words loaded with semantic power, and sentences varying in length. His style is said to move away from affectation and aims to focus on the meaning, avoiding undue emphasis on the structure. In much of what he had written, Kurd 'Ali is sometimes argued to follow the same course of the writing as that of Ibn Khaldoun in his Introduction.

Muhammad Kurd 'Ali assumed several jobs and positions in the press, in the university, in the Ministry, in the Arab Science Assembly in Damascus, and in the language Council in Egypt. He assumed the Ministry of Education twice in the era of the French occupation. He fills a prestigious literary and scientific place among his peers of other influential Arab scholars. His writings reached the number of twenty-two authorships including:

- Khitat al sham (Description of Syria) six volumes, one of his most important works.
- Al Islam wa al hadara al arabiya (Islam and Arab civilization) two volumes.
- Tareekh al hadara (History of civilization) are two parts, translated from French.
- Ghara'eb al gharb (Oddities of the West) two volumes.
- Akwalana wa af'alana (Our words and deeds) two volumes.
- Dimashq, madinat al sihr wa al shi'r (Damascus, city of charm and poetry).
- Ghaber al andalus wa hadoroha (The Past of Andalusia and its Present).
- Omara 'o al biaan (Princes of Eloquency) are two parts.
- Al kadeem wa al hadeeth (The Old and the New), which is a selection of his articles.
- Konoz al ajdad (Ancestors' Treasures).
- Al idara al islamiya fi iz al arab (The Islamic Administration under Arabs).
- Ghotat Dimashq (The Oasis of Damascus)
- Almozakart (The Diaries) four parts.

Muhammad Kurd 'Ali died On Thursday of April 2, 1953 in Damascus, and was buried beside the tomb of Muawiya bin Abi Sufyan in Damascus.

== See also ==
- List of Kurdish philosophers
