= Khalidi Library =

Library in Jerusalem

- المكتبة الخالدية
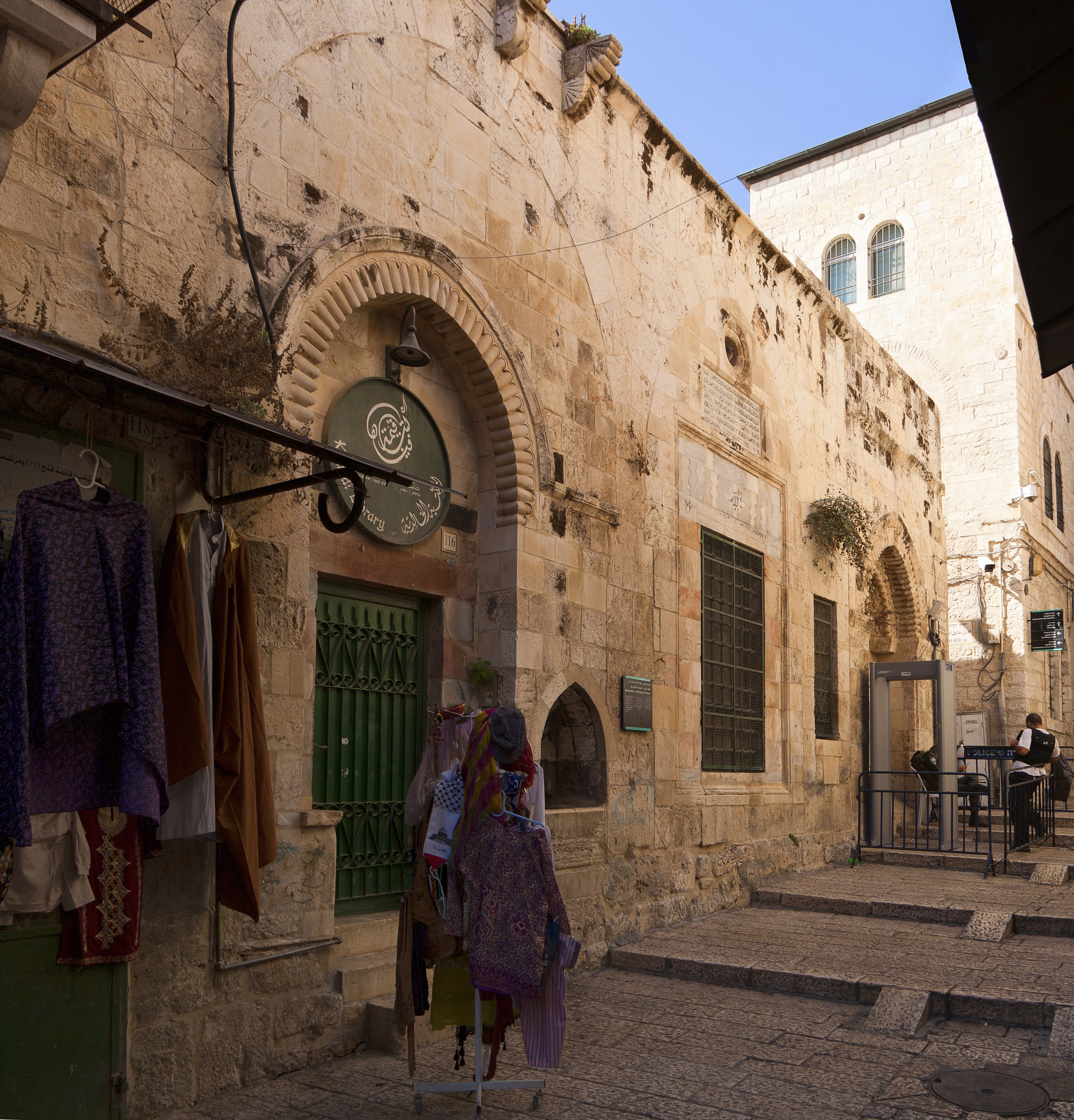
- Khalidi Library, 2015
- 31.768519653720578°N 35.21406404958221°E
- Location: Jerusalem
- Established: 1900

The Khalidi Library (Arabic: المكتبة الخالدية, romanized: al-Maktaba al-Khālidiyya) is a library and archive in the Old City of Jerusalem. It was established in 1900, under Ottoman rule.

== Location ==
The Turba Baraka Khan/Khalidi Library is on the south side of the Chain Gate street (Tariq Bab es-Silsileh); at the junction between this street and Aqabat Abu Madyan street. It is opposite the Kīlāniyya and the Ṭāziyya.

== Overview ==
The Khalidi Library was established c. 1900 as one of Ottoman Palestine's first public libraries, consisting primarily of works in Arabic by Hajj Raghib al-Khalidi, an Islamic judge and member of the prominent Khalidi family of Jerusalem. The library originated in the personal collections of books and manuscripts accumulated by the Khalidi family over the course of several centuries. This makes the Khalidi Library one of the largest collections of Palestinian literary and historical documents in the Levant built by Palestinians. Today, Khalidi Library holds the largest private collection of manuscripts in Jerusalem.

== Turba Baraka Khan ==
The Khalidi Library was and continues to be housed in a Mamluk-era building in the Old City of Jerusalem. The building was restored in 792AH/1389CE as the burial site (turba) of Amir Husam al-Din Barkah Khan, a military chieftain of Kwarizmian origin, and his two sons. His daughter married the Mamluk sultan, Baibars, and became the mother of al-Said Barakah. In 1265 a son, Emir Badr al-Din Muhammad Bi received all of the revenues from Deir al-Ghusun from Baibars. This son established a waqf; giving the revenues of Deir al-Ghusun and a mosque and a tomb (turba), now the Khalidi Library, for "the cure of the sick and the preparing of the dead for burial in Jerusalem."

== History ==
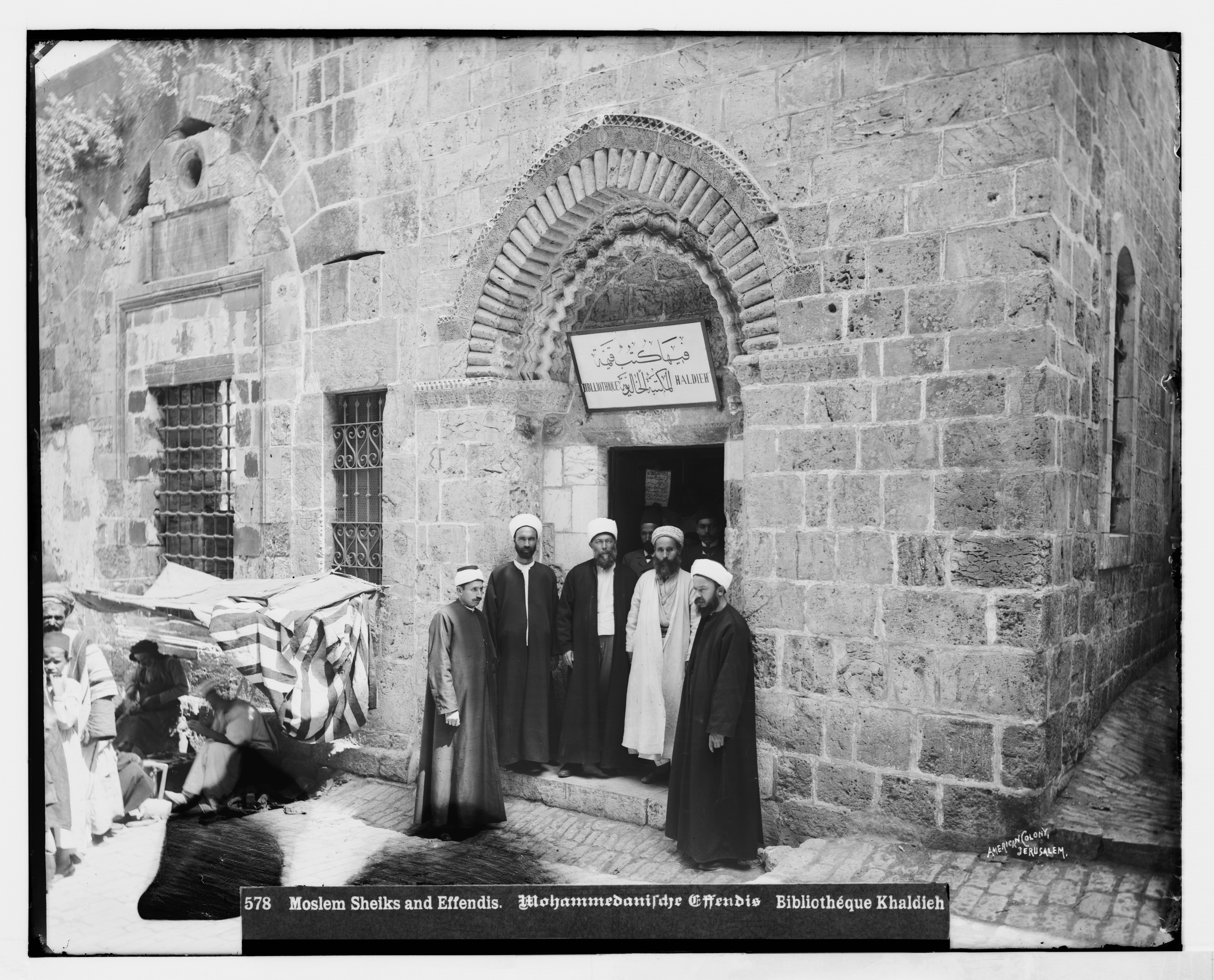
Khalidi Library, from the opening c. 1900. From right: Hajj Raghib al-Khalidi, Sheikh Taher al-Jaza’ireh (from Damascus), Sheikh Musa Shafiq al-Khalidi, Sheikh Khalil al-Khalidi, Sheikh Muhammad al-Habbal (from Beirut)

The Khalidi family's long-time prosperity and prominence in Ottoman and Arab society enabled them to collect and preserve one of the finest private libraries in Palestine. Each generation of Khalidis made contributions to the collection. Sun Allah al-Khalidi, Chief Secretary to the Religious Court of Jerusalem until his death in 1726, was responsible for securing the foundation of the early collection. Shortly before his death, Sun Allah al-Khalidi set up a waqf, bequeathing revenue from his substantial land holdings across Jerusalem to pay for the trusteeship of eighty-five manuscripts in perpetuity. According to Lawrence Conrad, a British historian who catalogued many of the Khalidi's treasures, the Khalidi patriarchs actively built their manuscript collection by bargaining in the medieval literary markets of Cairo, Damascus, and Istanbul.

The establishment of the Khalidi Library as a public institution was made possible by a vast sum bequeathed to Hajj Raghib al-Khalidi (1866-1952) by his grandmother, daughter of the kazasker of Anatolia. According to historian Lawrence Conrad, the Khalidi family saw themselves as upholding the inherited tradition of the Greeks and Abbasids in founding a library to spread their wealth of knowledge. The announcement of the public opening of the library emphasized this connection between libraries, cultural progress and prosperity by invoking great libraries of the Hellenic and medieval Arab Mediterranean worlds. The year of the Khalidi's public opening is often cited as 1900, however in a recent study, Conrad suggested that the library may have opened a few years earlier.

The library was among the first non-Western buildings in Palestine to have an exterior sign with text; its original sign announced its name in both French and Arabic as well as the phrase "within are precious books."

The library was private in that it was formed, funded and managed by the Khalidi family; however, it was open to the public. The introductory statement in the library's first published catalogue emphasized the library's openness to "any person desiring to read." Books were not allowed to circulate outside of the building. The Khalidi Library operated in this fashion for over half a century. With the death of Shaykh Khalil al-Khalidi in 1941, Ahmed Samih al-Khalidi had help from Stephan Hanna Stephan in managing and copying the collection, before both had to flee the Nakba.

The library survived the turbulence of 1947-1948, during which the contents of many of Jerusalem's Palestinian libraries, both public and private, were transferred to the National Library of Israel.

Shortly after the Six-Day War and the Israeli occupation of East Jerusalem in 1967, the Khalidi Library was closed to the public. The neighboring building, also owned by Khalidi family, was occupied by the Israel Defense Forces (IDF), and later turned into a yeshiva. The library itself was saved from similar confiscation after a lengthy legal battle. According to Haifa Khalidi, a mutawilla or guardian of the Library, Shlomo Goren, during his time serving as Chief Rabbi of the Military Rabbinate of the IDF, attempted to purchase the property, but was rebuffed by the Khalidi family.

Beginning in 1987, the Dutch government figured prominently in securing the future of the Khalidi Library, providing funding for manuscript conservation and renovation of the library building. Conservation work on the library's 12,000 manuscripts was carried out by Tony Bish of the Wellcome Trust. Shortly after beginning conservation work at the Khalidi Library, a separate trove of 29,000 fragments, sections and folios of manuscripts were discovered in the loft of the library. Renovation and refitting of the library building took place over two periods, 1991–1994 and 1995–1997, and consisted of restoring the Mamluk-era building, building an annex to house Khalidi family archival documents, and installing modern shelving units and furniture.

The Khalidi Library is financially supported by a combination of grants, family contributions, and private donations. Since 1989, the Friends of the Khalidi Library (FKL), a non-profit organization registered in Massachusetts, has acted as a conduit for this support. The FKL's current chair of the board of trustees is Professor Walid Khalidi.

According to the Khalidi Library's website in 2015, the premises were undergoing renovation, and therefore closed to the public. The renovation is expected to finish sometime in 2015, after which the Library will open to the public for the first time in 47 years. The reopened Khalidi Library will offer workshops on book-binding, calligraphy, and manuscript restoration aimed at engaging not only academics, but the wider Jerusalem public.

The library opened on 15 December 2018, and is open to the public on Saturdays, Tuesdays and Wednesdays; 10.00 to 15.00.

== Collection ==
The Khalidi Library's first catalogue was published in 1900, shortly after the institution's establishment. This first catalogue is significant for the insight it offers into the scholarly interests and literary tastes of the Palestinian elite at the turn of the 20th century. The Khalidi Library continued in the classical tradition of Islamic learning in its collection of religious works and valuable manuscripts. However, the Khalidi Library departed from classical tradition in its accumulation of works concerning the histories and ideas of Europe, "thereby marking a nascent cultural trend in Palestine," as noted by historian Ami Ayalon.

The original library comprised 2,168 items, of which 1,156 items appeared in the published catalogue and another 1,012 items in an unpublished list. The collection included both manuscripts and printed works. At least 1,138 printed books existed in the library's collection upon its establishment, the vast majority of which were imported from Egypt, Lebanon, and Europe. Among these imported works included studies on European history. This collection was expanded over the years to include dictionaries and grammar books on all major European languages, multiple translations of the Bible, the complete works of Plato and Voltaire, texts by Josephus, Dante, Milton, Shakespeare, as well as studies by Western Orientalists. The collection grew to approximately 4,000 items by 1917, and over 7,000 items by 1936.

The Khalidi Library has the largest private collection of medieval manuscripts in Jerusalem, and the largest private collection of Arabic and Islamic manuscripts in the Palestinian territories. Most of the manuscripts are written in Arabic, though there are some in Persian and Turkish. The oldest dated manuscript is an 11th-century treatise on sharia as written by a member of the Maliki school of Islamic legal thought. Among the most treasured works in the collection are those manuscripts written in the hand of the original author, as opposed to a copyist; these are referred to as umm or "mother," manuscripts. Makrumahs or presentation copies, are another category of treasured works. Makrumahs were often commissioned for royal libraries, and thus demonstrate especially fine craftsmanship. One makrumah is a gilded tribute to Saladin, dated to 1201 and grandiloquently titled The Spacious Lands of Commendations and the Garden of the Glorious and Praiseworthy Deeds Among the Merits of the Victorious King. Approximately half of the manuscript collection is composed of religious works; the other half includes subjects such as disparate as medicine, rhetoric, logic, and philosophy. Among the manuscript collection, are documents known as ijazahs, permits to teach a certain subject of Islamic knowledge.

The library's collection also includes correspondence, private papers, and legal documents from generations of the Khalidi family, including Ruhi Khalidi and former Mayor of Jerusalem Yousef Khalidi.

The manuscript collection is digitized and available on the website of the Hill Museum & Manuscript Library.

== Catalogues ==
The Khalidi Library's website hosts scanned copies of five old catalogues, including the original 1900 catalogue, as downloadable PDF files.

The most recent catalogue was published in 2006 by al-Furqan Islamic Heritage Foundation. The 2006 catalogue focuses only on the Arabic-language manuscript collection. It is also accessible on the library's website. The library does not yet have an online public access catalogue.

== See also ==
- Al-Budeiri Library
- Al-Aqsa Library
- Issaf Nashashibi Center for Culture and Literature

== Bibliography ==
- Berchem, van, M. (1920). MIFAO 45.1 Matériaux pour un Corpus Inscriptionum Arabicarum Part 2 Syrie du Sud T.3 Jérusalem Index général. Cairo: Impr. de l'Institut français d'archéologie orientale.
- Berchem, van, M. (1922). MIFAO 43 Matériaux pour un Corpus Inscriptionum Arabicarum Part 2 Syrie du Sud T.1 Jérusalem "Ville" (in French and Arabic). Cairo: Impr. de l'Institut français d'archéologie orientale. (pp. 185−194)
- Burgoyne, Michael Hamilton (1987). Mamluk Jerusalem. ISBN 090503533X. (pp. 109−116)
- Khalidi, Walid (2020). The Khalidi Library in Jerusalem, 1720-2001. Beirut: Institute for Palestine Studies.
- Mayer, L.A. (1933). Saracenic Heraldry: A Survey. Oxford: Oxford University Press. (Mayer, 1933, pp. 16-17, 158)
- Moudjir ed-dyn (1876). Sauvaire (ed.). Histoire de Jérusalem et d'Hébron depuis Abraham jusqu'à la fin du XVe siècle de J.-C. : fragments de la Chronique de Moudjir-ed-dyn.
- Pierotti, Emerete; Bonney, T.G. (1864). Jerusalem explored. Vol. 2. London: Bell and Daldy.
- Walls, A. G. ‘The Turbat Barakat Khan or Khalidi Library’, Levant, vi, 1974, 25. 20.
