= Kniahynyn =

Coordinates: 48.9356°N 24.7133°E

Kniahynyn (Ukrainian: Княгинин, Polish: Knihinin) is a former village and currently a neighborhood in the city of Ivano-Frankivsk, in Ivano-Frankivsk Oblast, Ukraine. It is located at northwestern portion of the city on the right bank of Bystrytsia River and known for its alcohol factory "Kniahynyn" that exists since the 19th century.

The first mention of the village was in 1449. In 1921 there were 16,554 inhabitants of the village, and Knihinin had the fourth largest city population of Stanisławów Voivodeship (after Kołomyja, Stanisławów and Stryj).

On January 1, 1925, Knihinin was incorporated into the city of Stanisławów and ceased to be an independent village.
