= Mustafa al-Khalidi =

Mayor of Jerusalem (1938–1944)

- مصطفى الخالدي
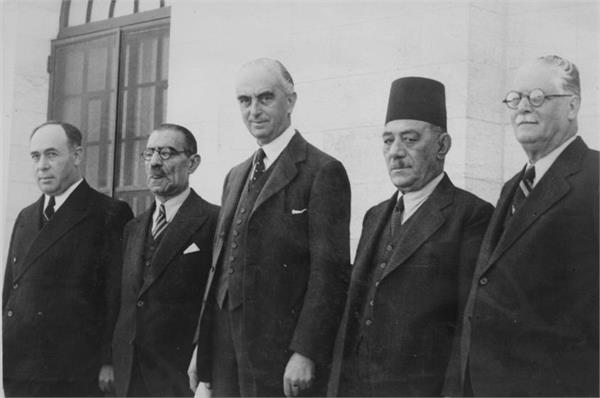
- High Commissioner Harold MacMichael with Palestinian Mayors 1942: from left - Israel Rokach (Tel Aviv), Mustafa al-Khalidi (Jerusalem), MacMichael, Omar Effendi al Bitar (Jaffa), Shabtai Levy (Haifa)

Mayor of Jerusalem
- In office 1938–1944
- Preceded by: Hussein al-Husayni
- Succeeded by: Daniel Auster

Personal details
- Born: Jerusalem, Ottoman Empire
- Occupation: Judge, Politician

Mustafa al-Khalidi (Arabic: مصطفى الخالدي, romanized: Muṣṭafā al-Khālidī) was a Palestinian politician and member of the prominent Khalidi family. Between 1938 and 1944, he became the last Palestinian-Arab mayor of Jerusalem (including West Jerusalem) who held this position coupled with real authority.

== Career ==
Khalidi was well educated and before his involvement in politics had a career as a judge. In response to rumours of Haifa mayor Hasan Bey Shukri's perceived collaboration with Zionism, Khalidi said to Daniel Auster: "We must recognise the facts; the Zionists have migrated to this country, become citizens, have become Palestinians, and they cannot be thrown into the sea. Likewise, some of them have bought land and received deeds in exchange for money and we must recognise them. There is no point in closing our eyes about such things." Nonetheless, he was opposed to mass Jewish immigration, but was amenable to accepting limited numbers.

== See also ==
- Yasser Arafat
