= Ruhi Khalidi =

Ottoman politician

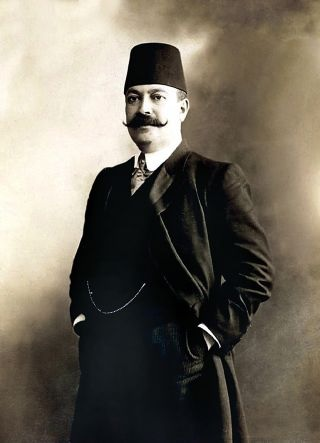
Ruhi al-Khalidi

Ruhi al-Khalidi (Arabic: روحي الخالدي; 1864–1913) was a writer, teacher, activist and politician in the Ottoman Empire at the turn of the twentieth century. He was the nephew of Yousef al-Khalidi, who was mayor of Jerusalem from 1899 to 1907. In 1908, he was one of three delegates elected to represent Jerusalem in the new Ottoman government run by the Young Turks and later become the deputy to the head of parliament (1911).

== Biography ==
Ruhi Khalidi was born into a very prominent Palestinian family in Jerusalem. It is still the case today, where the family runs the Khalidi Library in the Old City of Jerusalem. When the library was first established, Khalidi had a hand in making sure the library was more available to the wider public. His interest in French writers contributed to the collection's literature by Montesquieu and Victor Hugo.

Khalidi studied Islamic sciences and philosophy in Paris, was a lecturer at Sorbonne University, and was a scholar and teacher at the Special School for Oriental Languages in Paris. He was also appointed Counsel General of the Ottoman Empire in Bordeaux from 1898 to 1908.

Khalidi was a high-profile critic of the earliest stages of Zionism, although he made a sincere effort to better understand the movement by attending Yiddish plays, briefly studying at the Alliance Israelite School in Jerusalem and also owning Hebrew texts. He was one of the first Palestinians to study modern Hebrew, and he left behind a workbook in which he transliterated a whole host of Hebrew-Arabic cognates and other basic vocabulary.

In his capacity as an Ottoman parliamentarian, Khalidi raised the Ottoman parliament's 1911 debate on Zionism with his co-representative Sa'id al-Husayni. Khalidi advocated for an approach of anti-Zionism, but his debate record contains repeated clarifications to other parliamentarians that he was arguing against Jewish migration to Palestine, but not against the residence or status of Palestinian Jews.

He also visited Zionist settlements and wrote extensively about them in his unpublished book titled "Zionism and the Zionist Question". While writing the book he kept it secret in fear of "political repercussions involved with even writing about a nationalistic movement". The book was a wide-ranging analysis that drew on his reading of the Hebrew Bible and his encounters with the Zionist settlers. These visits were an attempt to build a case against the Zionist movement. Khalidi wanted to restrict Jewish immigration to Palestine and opposed land sales to Jews. His sentiments were based on the fear that Zionists wanted to create their own state with an exclusive social and political system. He understood that the Zionists were attempting to create a nation where they would no longer be second class citizens or outsiders, but he felt their goals would be detrimental to the Ottoman Empire and all the people in it as a whole. Khalidi was criticized by Zionists and non-Zionists for wanting to make illegal the purchase of land not only by unregistered Jewish immigrants, but also Jews that were natural citizens of the Ottoman Empire.

When Zionist leader Jacobus Kann published a book calling for the establishment of a Jewish army in the name of the Zionist movement, Khalidi had the book translated to French and distributed to other Palestinian nationalists in order to call attention to the militant side of the Zionist movement. He also signed petitions and helped lobby the governor's and sultan's offices to enact stronger restrictions on Jewish immigration.

Khalidi saw his destiny as firmly tied to the Ottoman Empire and was not an Arab Nationalist. He had ties to the Young Turks and even wrote one of the first copies of their political manifesto.

Khalidi died of typhoid in 1913 while working as deputy to the head of Parliament in Istanbul (Constantinople). Some members of his family believed he had actually been poisoned because his beliefs. His unfinished book was never published and was inherited by his older brother. Toward the end of his life, he expressed anger at the Ottoman government for not recognizing the threat that the Zionist movement posed against Palestine.
