= Yousef al-Khalidi =

Arab Jerusalemite and Ottoman politician (1842–1906)

Yusuf Dia Pasha al-Khalidi
- يوسف ضياء الدين باشا الخالدي
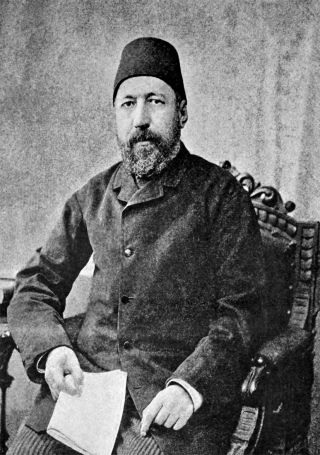

Mayor of Jerusalem
- In office 1870–1876
- In office 1878–1879
- In office 1899–1906

Personal details
- Born: 1842 Jerusalem
- Died: 25 January 1906 (aged 63–64)
- Education: Oriental Academy of Vienna
- Occupation: Politician

Yusuf Dia Pasha al-Khalidi (Arabic: يوسف ضياء الدين باشا الخالدي, Yousef Ḍiya’ ad-Dīn Bāshā al-Khalidī; 1842–1906) was a prominent Ottoman politician who served as mayor of Jerusalem during several non-consecutive terms in the nineteenth and early twentieth centuries. Al Khalidi served as mayor of Jerusalem from the years 1870 to 1876, 1878 to 1879, and 1899 to 1906.

He was an elected member of the first Ottoman parliament, where he represented Jerusalem. He was also a governor, translator, professor and prolific writer. As an Ottoman patriot and an active participant in the reform of the system following Egyptian withdrawal from Syria, Khalidi was proud of his Jerusalem heritage, and was a relentless reformer of the Ottoman system from within, rather than a precursor of Arab, or Syrian independence from the Ottomans. He continuously referred to his homeland (watani) as Jerusalem.

== Early life and education ==
Al-Khalidi was born in Jerusalem, Ottoman Palestine in 1842. His father, al-Sayyid Muhammad Ali al-Khalidi, served as deputy qadi and chief of the Jerusalem Sharia court secretariat in Jerusalem, Ottoman Empire for about fifty years. Members of the Khalidi family, one of the politically prominent old families of the local nobility (the others being the al-Husayni family and the Nashashibi family), continuously held the office through the 18th and 19th centuries. Although the Husayni family was larger and wealthier, the Khalidis were more united and noted for their intellect. (Note: The Husayni were the larger and wealthier of the two families, but according to the German consul, the Khalidi made up for this through greater unity and intelligence (Scholch 2005, p. 67))

As a teenager, al-Khalidi may have been influenced by the Ottoman Reform Edict of 1856. At the age of 17, he wrote of his thoughts about the state of the world, personal dignity and the individual's quest to become free, in the context of meditations on why the Ottoman Empire was being increasingly surrounded by European powers pilfering the region of its wealth and identified the cause of the situation to be the disparity in knowledge between the region and Europe. The interests of the country, he argued, could only be defended by dropping frivolous studies and acquiring scientific, historical and philosophical knowledge.

Yousef's initial requests to receive an education in Egypt was turned down because he lacked an invitation from that country and his father rebuffed his proposal that he be educated in Europe. Afterward he and his cousin Husayn left Jerusalem without the family's permission and reached Malta where they were enrolled into the Protestant college through the mediation of the Anglican bishop Gobat of Jerusalem. There, he studied English and French. Yousef's brother Yasin persuaded him after two years in the Protestant college to attend the Imperial Medical School in Constantinople, capital of the Empire. Yousef was dissatisfied with his time at the medical school after a year, finding no "salvation, he enrolled in an American Protestant missionary school outside of the capital, Robert College." He remained there for a year and a half before returning to Jerusalem because of the death of his father.

Later in life he taught Semitic languages in the Oriental Academy of Vienna, where he also wrote the first Kurdish-Arabic dictionary.

== Career ==
Al-Khalidi served as mayor of Jerusalem from the years 1870 to 1876, 1878 to 1879, and 1899 to 1906.

Al-Khalidi played a key role in the opposing political factions established to prohibit the Ottoman Empire's attempts to violate the constitution. Al-Khalidi was very familiar with Zionist thought, and the anti-Semitic environment in Europe out of which it emerged. He also perceived the danger Zionism could expose Jews to throughout the domains of the Ottoman Empire.

Compelled by a "holy duty of conscience" to voice his concerns that Zionism would jeopardize the friendly associations between Muslims, Christians and Jews, he wrote a letter On 1 March 1899 to Zadok Kahn, the chief rabbi of France, to prevail on Zionists, through Kahn's offices, to leave the area of Palestine in peace. (Note: 'Qui peut contester les droits des Juifs sur la Palestine ? Mon Dieu, historiquement, c’est bien votre pays ! Et quel spectacle merveilleux ça serait si les Juifs, si doués, étaient de nouveau reconstitués en une nation indépendante, respectée, heureuse, pouvant rendre à la pauvre humanité des services dans le domaine comme autrefois! Malheureusement, les destinées des nations ne sont point gouvernées seulement par ces conceptions abstraites, si pures, si nobles qu’elles puissent être. Il faut compter avec la réalité, avec les faits acquis, avec la force brutale des circonstances. Or la réalité est que la Palestine fait maintenant partie intégrale de l’Empire Ottoman et, ce qui est plus grave, elle est habitée par d’autres que des Israélites. Cette réalité, ces faits acquis, cette force brutale des circonstances ne laissent au zionisme (sic), géographiquement aucun espoir de réalisation, et ce qui est surtout important, menacent d’un vrai danger la situation des Juifs en Turquie. Certes, les Turcs et les Arabes sont généralement bien disposés envers vos coreligionnaires. Cependant, il y a parmi eux aussi des fanatiques, eux aussi, comme toutes les autres nations même les plus civilisées, ne sont pas exempts des sentiments de haine de race. En outre, il y a en Palestine des chrétiens fanatiques, surtout parmi les orthodoxes et les catholiques qui, considérant la Palestine comme devant appartenir à eux seulement, sont très jaloux des progrès des Juifs dans le pays de leurs ancêtres et ne laissent passer aucune occasion pour exciter la haine des musulmans contre les Juifs. Il faut donc, pour la tranquillité des Juifs en Turquie, que le mouvement sioniste, dans le sens géographique du mot, cesse. Que l’on cherche un endroit quelque part pour la malheureuse nation juive, rien de plus juste et équitable. Mon Dieu, la terre est assez vaste, il y a encore des pays inhabités où l'on pourrait placer des millions d'israélites pauvres, qui y deviendront peut-être heureux et un jour constitueraient une nation. Ça serait peut-être la meilleure, la plus rationnelle solution de la question juive. Mais, au nom de Dieu, qu'on laisse tranquille la Palestine.')

"I flatter myself to think that I need not speak of my feelings towards Your people. As far as the Israelites are concerned [...], I really do regard them as relatives of us Arabs; for us they are cousins; we really do have the same father, Abraham, from whom we are also descended. There are a lot of affinities between the two races; we have almost the same language. Politically, moreover, I am convinced that the Jews and Arabs will do well to support each other if they are to resist the invaders of other races. It is these sentiments that put me at ease to speak frankly to You about the great question that is currently agitating your people.

You are well aware that I am talking about Zionism. The idea in itself is only natural, beautiful and just. Who can dispute the rights of the Jews to Palestine? My God, historically it is Your country! And what a marvellous spectacle it would be if the Jews, so gifted, were once again reconstituted as an independent nation, respected, happy, able to render services to poor humanity in the moral domain as in the past!

Unfortunately, the destinies of nations are not governed solely by these abstract conceptions, however pure, however noble they may be. We must reckon with reality, with established facts, with force, yes with the brutal force of circumstances. But the reality is that Palestine is now an integral part of the Ottoman Empire and, what is more serious, it is inhabited by people other than only Israelites. This reality, these acquired facts, this brutal force of circumstances leave Zionism, geographically, no hope of realisation."

— Translated excerpts from the letter in French from Yusuf Diya al-Khalidi to Zadoc Kahn, the chief Rabbi of France, dated March 1, 1899.

According to Rashid Khalidi (al-Khalidi's great-great-great-nephew), Alexander Scholch and Dominique Perrin, Khalidi was prescient in predicting that, regardless of Jewish historic rights, given the geopolitical context, Zionism could stir an awakening of Arab nationalism uniting Christians and Muslims. (Note: 'L’auteur de cette lettre admet qu’il peut exister un droit historique des Juifs à s’établir en Palestine. Mais il écarte immédiatement cette perspective au nom des réalités géographiques du moment. Et surtout il entrevoit que le sionisme peut contribuer à éveiller le nationalisme arabe local en réunissant dans une même opposition Chrétiens et Musulmans. La suite des événements confirme cette analyse.')

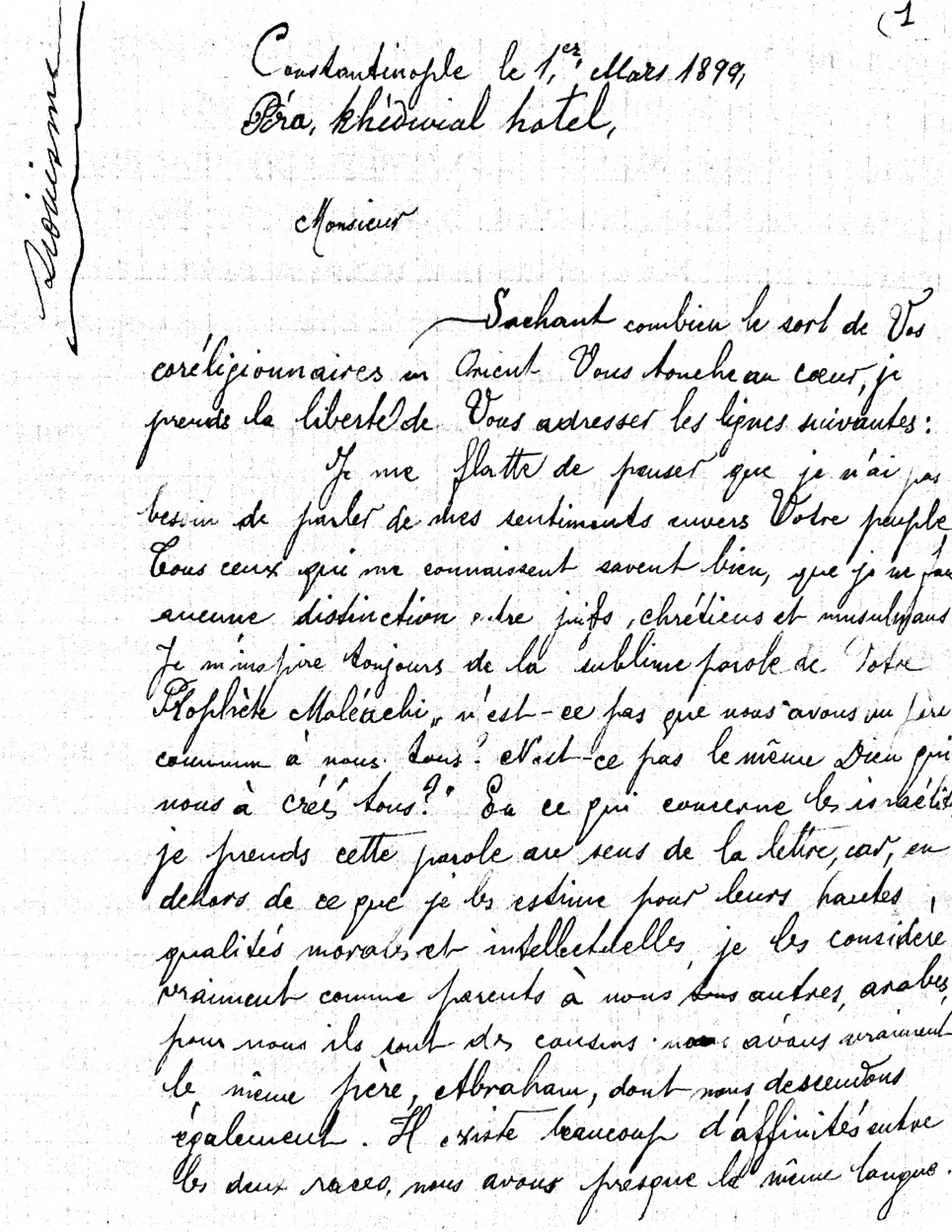
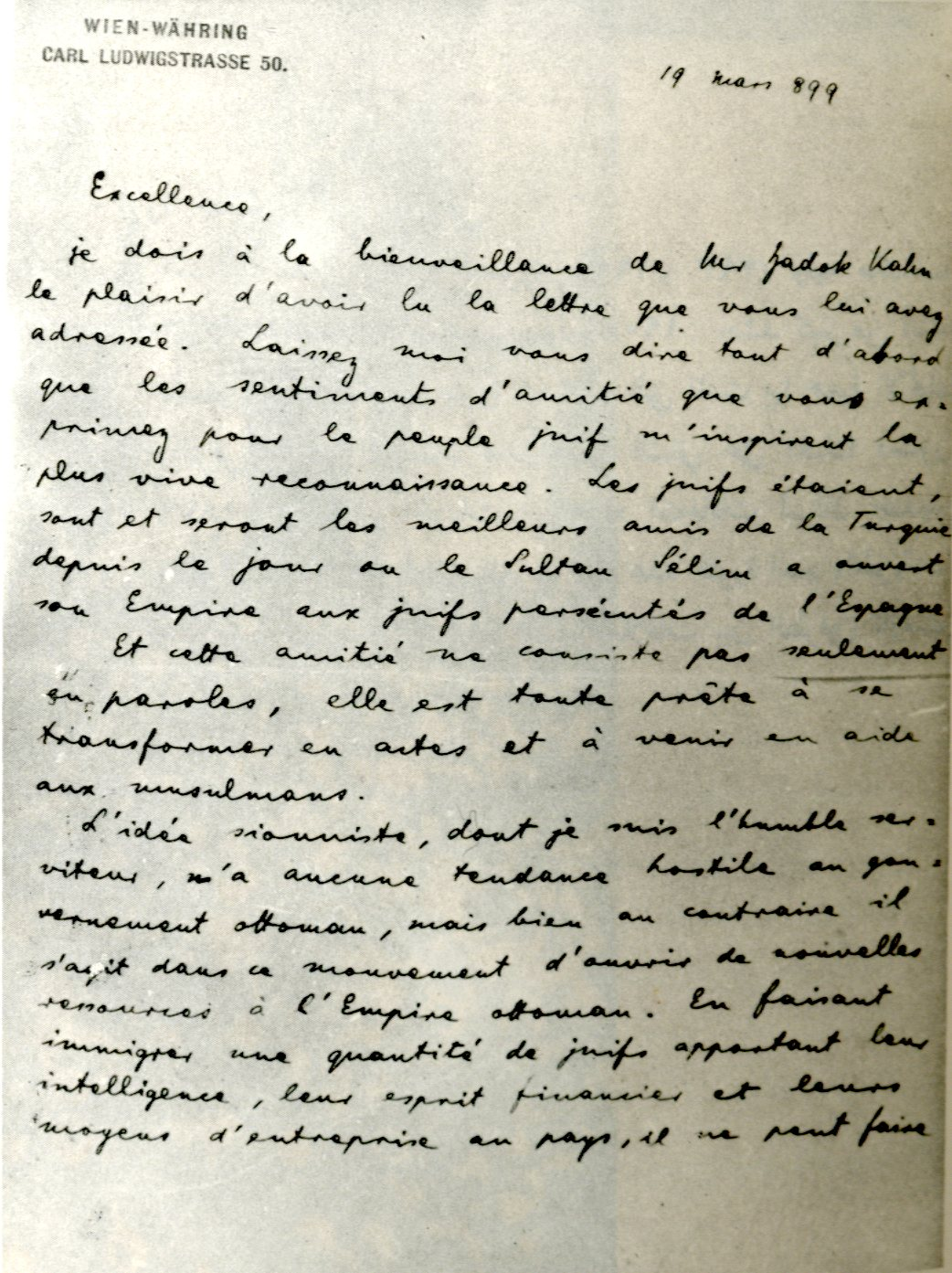
March 1899 correspondence between Yousef al-Khalidi and Theodore Herzl.

On 19 March 1899 Herzl replied to al-Khalidi arguing that both the Ottoman Empire and the non-Jewish population of Palestine would benefit from Jewish immigration. As to al-Khalidi concerns about the non-Jewish majority population of Palestine, Herzl replied rhetorically: "who would think of sending them away?" and concluded ambiguously that "If he (the Ottoman Sultan) will not accept it, we will search and, believe me, we will find elsewhere what we need." (Note: "S'il n'acceptera pas nous chercherons et croyez moi nous trouverons ailleurs ce qu'il nous faut." (Scholch 2005, p. 72))

The Zionist idea, of which I am the humble servant, has no hostile tendency toward the Ottoman Government, but quite to the contrary this movement is concerned with opening up new resources for the Ottoman Empire. In allowing immigration to a number of Jews bringing their intelligence, their financial acumen and their means of enterprise to the country, no one can doubt that the well-being of the entire country would be the happy result. It is necessary to understand this, and make it known to everybody.

As Your Excellency said very well in your letter to the Grand Rabbi, the Jews have no belligerent Power behind them, neither are they themselves of a warlike nature. They are a completely peaceful element, and very content if they are -left in peace. Therefore, there is absolutely nothing to fear from their immigration.

The question of the Holy Places?

But no one thinks of ever touching those. As I have said and written many times: These places have lost forever the faculty of belonging exclusively to one faith, to one race or to one people. The Holy Places are and will remain holy for all the world, for the Moslems as for the Christians as for the Jews. The universal peace which all men of good will ardently hope for will have its symbol in a brotherly union in the Holy Places.

You see another difficulty, Excellency, in the existence of the non-Jewish population in Palestine. But who would think of sending them away? It is their well-being, their individual wealth which we will increase by bringing in our own. Do you think that an Arab who owns land or a house in Palestine worth three or four thousand francs will be very angry to see the price of his land rise in a short time, to see it rise five and ten times in value perhaps in a few months? Moreover, that will necessarily happen with the arrival of the Jews. That is what the indigenous population must realize, that they will gain excellent brothers as the Sultan will gain faithful and good subjects who will make this province flourish-this province which is their historic homeland.

— Translated excerpts from the letter in French from Theodore Herzl to Yusuf Diya-uddin al-Khalidi dated 19 March 1899

== Death ==
Al-Khalidi died on 25 January 1906.

== Sources ==
- Büssow, Johann (2011). Hamidian Palestine: Politics and Society in the District of Jerusalem 1872-1908. Brill. ISBN 978-9-004-20569-7.
- Khalidi, Rashid (2020). The Hundred Years' War on Palestine: A History of Settler Colonialism and Resistance, 1917–2017. Metropolitan Books. ISBN 978-1-627-79854-9.
- Khalidi, Walid (1984). Before Their Diaspora: A Photographic History of the Palestinians 1876-1948. Institute for Palestine Studies. ISBN 978-0-887-28144-0.
- Perrin, Dominique (2020) [First published 2000]. Palestine: Une terre, deux peuples. Presses Universitaires du Septentrion. ISBN 978-2-757-42198-7.
- Scholch, Alexander [in German] (Summer 2005). "An Ottoman Bismarck from Jerusalem: Yusuf Diya' al-Khalidi (1842–1906)". Jerusalem Quarterly. 24: 65–77. doi:10.70190/jq.I24.p65.
- Scholch, Alexander [in German] (2006) [First published 1993]. Palestine in Transformation, 1856-1882: Studies in Social, Economic and Political Development (PDF). Institute for Palestine Studies. ISBN 978-0-887-28307-9.
