= Aisha Odeh =

Palestinian writer (born 1944)

- عائشة عودة
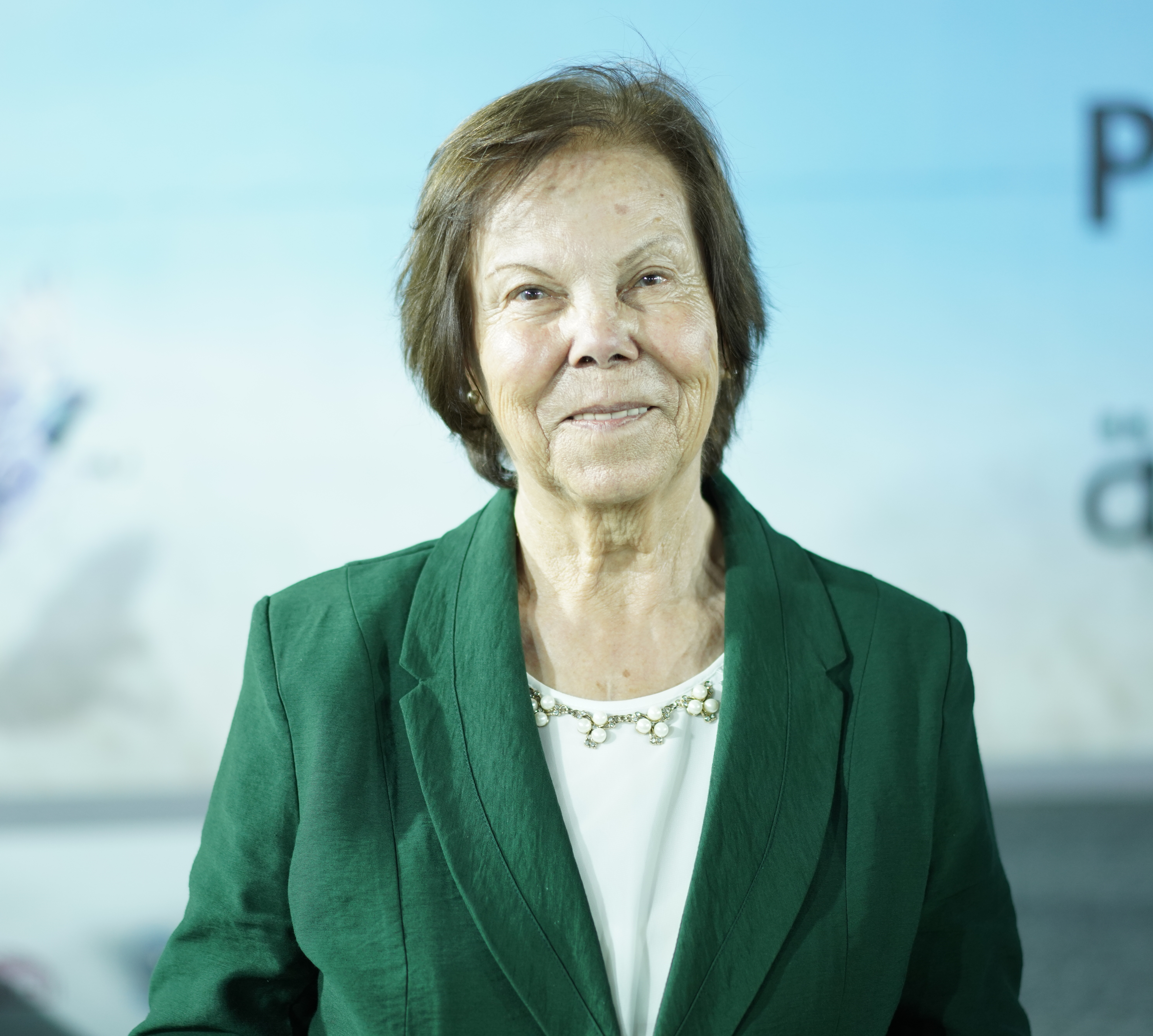
- Odeh in 2023
- Born: 1944 (age 81–82); Deir Jarir, Palestine
- Other names: Ayesha Audi
- Occupation: Writer

Aisha Odeh (Arabic: عائشة عودة, ALA-LC: ʻĀʼishah ʻAwdah; born 1944) is a Palestinian writer. As a member of the Popular Front for the Liberation of Palestine (PFLP), she was sentenced to life imprisonment after she participated in a 1969 supermarket bombing that killed two Israelis. Odeh received an early release in 1979 and has since remained an active participant in Palestinian organisations. She has published three books including an autobiography that details allegations of abuse during her imprisonment.

Odeh was the recipient of the Ibn Rushd Prize for Freedom of Thought in 2015.

== Early life ==
Odeh was born in Deir Jarir where she attended primary school. She completed her schooling in nearby Ramallah where she earned a diploma in education at the Teacher's College in Ramallah in 1966. Odeh worked as a mathematics and science teacher at Ein Yabrud Middle School for Girls from 1966.

Odeh became politically active in secondary school and joined the Arab Nationalist Movement. After its dissolution in 1967, she continued her political involvement with the Popular Front for the Liberation of Palestine.

== Bombing and imprisonment ==
On 21 February 1969, Odeh planted a bomb in a Jerusalem supermarket that resulted in the deaths of two Israeli students. She had worked with an accomplice, Rasmea Odeh (no relation), who chose the target and scouted the location.

On 1 March 1969, Odeh was arrested by Israeli forces; her parents' house was blown up by the Israeli army shortly afterwards as part of collective punishment. On 21 December 1970, she was sentenced by an Israeli military court in Lod to two life sentences plus ten years. Odeh was held in Neve Tirtza, the only women's prison in Israel. She details the events of her imprisonment in her memoir, أحلام بالحرية (Dreams of Freedom), including allegations of sexual violence, harassment and rape by her Israeli captors.

On 14 March 1979, Odeh was freed as part of a prisoner exchange agreement but was repatriated to Jordan. Odeh returned to Ramallah on 24 November 1994 after the signing of the Oslo Accord.

== Writing career ==
Odeh has published three books: her two-part autobiography as أحلام بالحرية (Dreams of Freedom; 2004) and ثمناً للشمس (The Price of the Sun; 2012), and the short story collection يوم مختلف (A Different Day; 2007).

In 2015, Odeh was awarded with the Ibn Rushd Prize for Freedom of Thought. The Ibn Rushd Prize 2015 had called for: "An author of a work of prison literature which stimulates a broad public debate on the situation of political prisoners, showing oppression and violation of human rights and demanding the right for liberty and human dignity in the Arab world." Odeh burst into tears when she found out that she had won the award and compared the feeling to being released from prison.

== Organisational memberships ==
Odeh has been a member of the Palestinian National Council since 1981 and the Palestinian Writers' Union since 2005. She was a member of the administrative council of the General Union of Palestinian Women from 1985 to 2007. Odeh was part of the central committee of the Democratic Front for the Liberation of Palestine from 1989 to 1991.

Odeh founded the Deir Jarir Women Society in 2002 and Association of Women Who Were Imprisoned for Freedom in 2010; she serves as president for both groups. Odeh also founded the Ashkelon Cultural Forum in 2011 and remains as a member. She served as the vice president of the Young Artists Forum from 2006 to 2010. Odeh is an active participant in lectures and cultural activities in secondary schools, universities and youth centres.

== Documentary appearances ==
Odeh appears in the 2004 documentary, Women in Struggle, where she describes her involvement in the 1969 bombing. She was interviewed for the 2007 documentary, Tell Your Tale, Little Bird, about the participation of women in the Palestinian resistance.

== Bibliography ==
- 2004: أحلام بالحرية (Dreams of Freedom)
- 2007: يوم مختلف (A Different Day)
- 2012: ثمناً للشمس (The Price of the Sun)
