= Palestine–Israel Journal =

Quarterly magazine in print since 1994

- Frequency: Quarterly
- Publisher: Middle East Publications
- Founded: 1994
- Based in: Jerusalem
- Language: English, Hebrew, Arabic
- Website: https://www.pij.org/

The Palestine–Israel Journal is an independent, non-profit, Jerusalem-based quarterly that aims to shed light on and analyze freely and critically, the complex issues dividing Israelis and Palestinians. In 2006 it was a candidate for the UNESCO-Madanjeet Singh Prize for the Promotion of Tolerance and Non-Violence and was recognized with a mention of honor for "its outstanding contribution to this great cause". In 2012, co-editors Hillel Schenker and Ziad Abuzayyad were awarded the Outstanding Contribution to Peace Award at the eighth International Media Awards held on May 5.

== The Journal ==
Half of every issue is devoted to exploring a major theme on the joint Israeli-Palestinian agenda, while the other half contains regular departments relating to Culture, Economics, Viewpoints, Book Reviews, Documents and a Chronology of Events. The Journal's goal is to promote rapprochement and better understanding between Palestinian and Israeli people, and striving to discuss all issues without prejudice or taboos. The Journal is a joint venture promoting dialogue and the quest for a peaceful resolution of the Israeli–Palestinian conflict. The Journal operates on the basis of cooperation, understanding and equality between the Israelis and Palestinians who comprise its joint staff. All decisions and work are shared and managed equally and in cooperation between a joint staff of Palestinian and Israel co-editors, managing editors and other staff.

The editors of the Journal are Palestinian journalist and former Minister Ziad AbuZayyad and veteran Israeli journalist and commentator Hillel Schenker. The editorial board is composed of an equal number of Israeli and Palestinian academics and journalists. Every issue contains an equal number of articles by Israeli and Palestinian contributors, with the addition of several international articles.

== History ==
The Palestine–Israel Journal was founded in early 1994 by Ziad AbuZayyad and veteran Israeli journalist Victor Cygelman (1926–2007) who was former deputy-editor of the Israeli peace journal New Outlook. The Journal was established, concurrently with the first phases of the Oslo peace process, as a response to a much-needed avenue for dialogue among the opinion and policy-makers of the region. It was obvious from the start that, alongside the institutional efforts of Palestinians and Israelis, channels of communication had to be opened for academics and other experts; opinion, decision and policy makers, as well as grass-roots organizations and activists, to voice their views, promote and take part in the public debate for a democratic and just solution to the conflict.

Many prominent academic experts, political figures, journalists and activists have written for the Journal. Among them are Prof. Shlomo Ben-Ami, Mohammed Dajani, Shlomo Gazit, Manuel Hassassian, Shimon Peres, Rashid Khalidi, Ghassan Kanafani, Benny Morris, David Newman, Sari Nusseibeh, Yoav Peled, Don Peretz, Desmond Tutu, Khalil Shikaki, Prof. Daniel Kurtzer, Johan Galtung, Salim Tamari, Moshe Amirav, Jimmy Carter, Kofi Annan and A.B. Yehoshua.

When Cygelman retired, he was replaced by Prof. Daniel Bar-Tal of Tel Aviv University, who served as the Israeli co-editor from 2001–2005. In 2005, veteran Israeli journalist and commentator Hillel Schenker replaced Bar-Tal as Israeli co-editor of the Journal.

== Public events and Journal outreach ==
After each issue is published, the Journal holds public discussions aimed at promoting widespread public debate on the topics raised by the issue. For each issue, three discussions are organized: one in Arabic for Palestinians, one in Hebrew for Israelis and one joint Palestinian-Israeli event run in English.

== Published issues ==
- Peace Economics (1994)
- Religion and Politics (1994)
- Water (1994)
- Psychological Dimensions of the Conflict (1994)
- Oslo (1995)
- Our Jerusalem (1995)
- Women in The Conflict (1995)
- Refugees (1995)
- Education (1996)
- Autonomy or Statehood? (1996)
- The Road Ahead (1996)
- Children of The Conflict (1997)
- The Struggle For Land (1997)
- The U.S.A. and The Conflict (1997)
- The Environment (1998)
- Focus on 1948-1998: A Tale of Two Peoples (1998)
- The Role of The Media (1998)
- Human Rights (1999)
- Towards Statehood (1999)
- Peace Economics Revisited (1999)
- The New Generation (1999)
- The Search for Regional Cooperation (2000)
- Settlements or Peace (2000)
- Jerusalem (2001)
- Education in Times of Conflict (2001)
- Post-Oslo: Impasse and Options (2001)
- National Identity (2002)
- Right of Return (2002)
- Separation or Conciliation (2002)
- Narratives of 1948 (2002)
- Violence and its Alternatives (2003)
- Media and the Second Intifada (2003)
- Human Rights Now (2003)
- Two Traumatized Societies (2003)
- A Quest for Peace and Security (2004)
- The International Community and the Conflict (2004)
- Public Opinion/Yasser Arafat 1929-2004 (2004/2005)
- Civil Society (2005)
- Anti-Semitism & Islamophobia (2005)
- People-to-People: What Went Wrong & How to Fix It? (2005/2006)
- Going It Alone? Unilateralism vs. Negotiations (2006)
- Hamas and Kadima: Are They Up to the Challenge? (2006)
- The Role of the International Community (2007)
- Jerusalem: 40 Years Later (2007)
- Future Options (2007)
- The Economic Dimension: Past, Present and Future (2007)
- The Arab Peace Initiative (2007)
- 1948: Sixty Years After (2008)
- Human Security (2008)
- The Refugee Question (2008/2009)
- The Next Generation: Young Palestinians and Israelis Look Towards the Future (2010)
- A Nuclear Free Zone in the Middle East (2010)
- Jerusalem: In the Eye of the Storm (2011)
- Women and Power (2011)
- Arab Spring (2012)
- Civil Society Challenges (2012)
- The Younger Generation (2013)
- A Middle East Without Weapons of Mass Destruction (2013)
- Two-State Solution at the Crossroads (2014)
- Natural Resources and the Arab-Israeli Conflict (2014)
- Time for International Legitimacy (2015)
- Religion and the Conflict (2015)
- Young Voices from Jerusalem (2015)

== Panels ==
People-to-People: What Went Wrong and How To Fix It? (June 6, 2006). Panelists: Elias Zanariri, Daniel Levy. Moderator: Gershon Baskin.

Cooperation and Alliance-Building between Israelis and Palestinians Today (July 25, 2006). Panelists: Avivit Hai, Aida Shibli, Rabbi Arik Ascherman, Zohar Shapira, Bassam Aramin. Moderator: Amit Leshem.

People-to-People: What Went Wrong and How To Fix It? (September 16, 2006). General discussion moderated by Ziad Abuzayyad.

Lebanon and Gaza: What Now? (September 19, 2006). Panelists: Ziad Abuzayyad, Danny Rubinstein, Raphael Israeli. Moderator: Benjamin Pogrund.

Is Israeli-Palestinian Peace Possible? A Proposal for Moving Forward (December 5, 2006). Keynote Speaker: Professor Johan Galtung. Panelists: Dr. Walid Salem, Professor Daniel Bar-Tal.

Is Israeli-Palestinian Peace Possible? A Proposal for Moving Forward (December 6, 2006). Keynote Speaker: Professor Johan Galtung. Moderator: Zahra Khalidi.

The National Unity Government and the Current Situation (June 6, 2007). Speakers: Ziad Abuzayyad, Jibril Rajoub, Mohammad Barghouti, Qais Abdel Karim.

The Role of the International Community (June 28, 2007). Speakers: Dr. Daniel Kurtzer, Professor Shlomo Ben-Ami, Dr. Saeb Erekat. Moderator: Ziad Abuzayyad.

Jerusalem: 40 Years Later (August 20, 2007). Speakers: Terry Boullata, Professor Naomi Chazan. Moderator: Nazmi Ju'beh.

Israeli and Palestinian Leaders' Policy Dilemmas: Can They Deliver? (August 28, 2007). Chair: Professor Amnon Cohen. Presentations by: Dr. Yaacov Shamir, Dr. Khalil Shikaki. Comments by: Ziad Abuzayyad, Dr. Nazmi al Ju'beh, Dov Weisglass, Akiva Eldar.

Future Options: What Could a Sustainable Solution for Israel-Palestine Look Like? (September 3, 2007). Keynote Speaker: Professor Johan Galtung. Moderator: Dr. Munther Dajani.

Jerusalem: 40 Years Later (October 28, 2007). Presentations by: Ziad Abuzayyad, Dr. Siham Thabet, Sheikh Ammar Badawi.

Talking about Gaza and Sderot (October 29, 2007). Speakers: Amira Hass, Professor Kenneth Mann, Nomika Zion, Um Haithem, Dr. Eyad Sarraj. Moderator: Anat Saragusti.

PIJ and IPCRI on the Annapolis Conference (November 7, 2007). Speakers: Ziad Abuzayyad, Dr. Ron Pundak.

“Lords of the Land” – Debating the impact of the Settlements (November 13, 2007). Speakers: Talia Sasson, Akiva Eldar. Moderator: Benjamin Pogrund. Introduction by Hillel Schenker.

The Role of the International Community (December 12, 2007). Speakers: Dr. Mufeed Qassum, Antoine Shalhat, Ziad Abuzayyad. Moderator: Nidal Erar.

1948: 60 Years After, Independence/Nakba, What Is Next?" (Aug 25, 2008). Speakers: Colette Avital, Jibril Rajoub, David Viveash. Introduction by Hillel Schenker.

Palestinian Refugees and the Two-State Solution (April 21, 2010). Speakers: Israela Orou, Dr. Adnan Abdelrazek, Dr. Ron Pundak, Dr. Nazmi Ju'beh. Moderators: Walid Salem, Hillel Schenker.

== Conferences ==
On January 27, 2010 Palestine–Israel Journal held a conference on Jerusalem entitled Israeli Settlements, Palestinian Refugees, and Gaza & the Two-State Solution. The conference coincided with the release of three position papers on these subjects, which were commissioned by the European Union. Speakers included Isaac Herzog and Ziad Abuzayyad.

On May 10, 2010 Palestine-Israel Journal, Friedrich-Ebert-Stiftung and School of Oriental and African Studies, London held in international conference in Jerusalem entitled A Nuclear Free Zone in the Middle East: Realistic or Idealistic?, following the publication of the March 2010 issue of the same name. Speakers included Dr. Avner Cohen, Dr. Farhang Jahanpour, Dr. Emily Landau, Dr. Bernd Kubbig, Jamil Rabah and Dr. Dan Plesch.

On June 8, 2010 Palestine–Israel Journal held a conference in conjunction with the Veneto Region under the auspices of the Peace Education through Media Project and with the support of the European Union's Partnership for Peace Project. The conference, entitled, "Peace Education Through Media", examined the role of the media and journalists in encouraging or discouraging violence, particularly in the context of the Israeli-Palestinian conflict.

On June 18–19, 2010 Palestine–Israel Journal and the International Dialogues Foundation held a conference in The Hague, Netherlands on the subject of, "Jerusalem: Dialogues for Justice and Peace". Speakers included Ziad Abuzayyad, Menachem Klein, Walid Salem, and Moshe Maoz.

On April 13, 2011 Palestine–Israel Journal, with Ir Amim, the International Crisis Group and OCHA held a conference entitled Jerusalem - In the Eye of the Storm, coinciding with the publication of the 2011 double issue of the same name. Split into two sessions, the conference focused first on the presentations of reports and studies. Presenters included Ray Dolphin, Ofer Zalzberg, Yehudit Oppenheimer, and Hillel Schenker, with Ziad Abuzayyad as moderator. The second session consisted of a panel entitled Talking About Jerusalem, with Hagit Ofran, Dr. Jad Isaac, Hillel Ben-Sasson and Dr. Omar Yousef as speakers. The panel was moderated by Dr. Adnan Abdelrazek.

On December 13, 2012, The Palestine–Israel Journal held a public event in Tel Aviv discussing the challenges facing Israeli and Palestinian Civil Society.

In January 2012, The Palestine–Israel Journal held an event sponsored by the EU Partnership for Peace outlining guidelines for the media professionals covering the Israeli-Palestinian conflict.

On March 18, 2012 in celebration of International Women's Day, the Palestine–Israel Journal held a conference titled Women in Power. Speakers included Lucy Nusseibeh, Professor Galia Golan and MK Michal Rozin.

In March, 2013, The Palestine–Israel Journal co-hosted two conferences with the Friedrich Ebert Stiftung Foundation; one called "Challenging the Israeli-Palestinian Stalemate" and the other "Jerusalem: Still Key to Any Future Israeli-Palestinian Agreement". Speakers included Ron Pundak, Hind Khoury and Muhammad Madani.

In April, 2014, co-editors Hillel Schenker and Ziad Abuzayyad flew to Washington D.C. to participate in a conference sponsored by The Foundation for Middle East Peace, Americans for Peace Now, and Churches for Middle East Peace titled "John Kerry's Initiative: Bump in the Road or End of the Road?".

The most recent conference was also co-sponsored by the Friedrich Ebert Stiftung Foundation held on April 9, 2014 in New York City titled "Advancing a Weapons of Mass Destruction-Free Zone in the Middle East". Speakers included Sameh Aboul-Enein, Shlomo Brom, Hillel Schenker, and Ziad AbuZayyad.

== Simcha Bahiri Youth Essay Prize Contest ==
On August 11, 2009 the Palestine–Israel Journal awarded the first Simcha Bahiri Youth Essay Prize. The contest was open to Israeli and Palestinian writers aged 17–24 on the subject of, "The Day After the Gaza War: What can young people do to strengthen the prospect of peace?". The inaugural winners of the award were Maya Wind, age 19, for her essay, "We Need an Israeli-Palestinian Doubt Forum" and Khadrah Jean JaserAbuZant, also 19, for her essay, "We Need Healing, Engagement, and Reconciliation".
