= AAAN =

AAAN may refer to:

- Arab American Action Network, a Chicago community center
- AETN All Asia Networks Pte. Ltd., the joint venture of A+E Networks and Astro All Asia Networks
- Astro All Asia Networks, the company that operates the Astro satellite network
