= Rashid Khalidi =

Palestinian-American historian (born 1948)

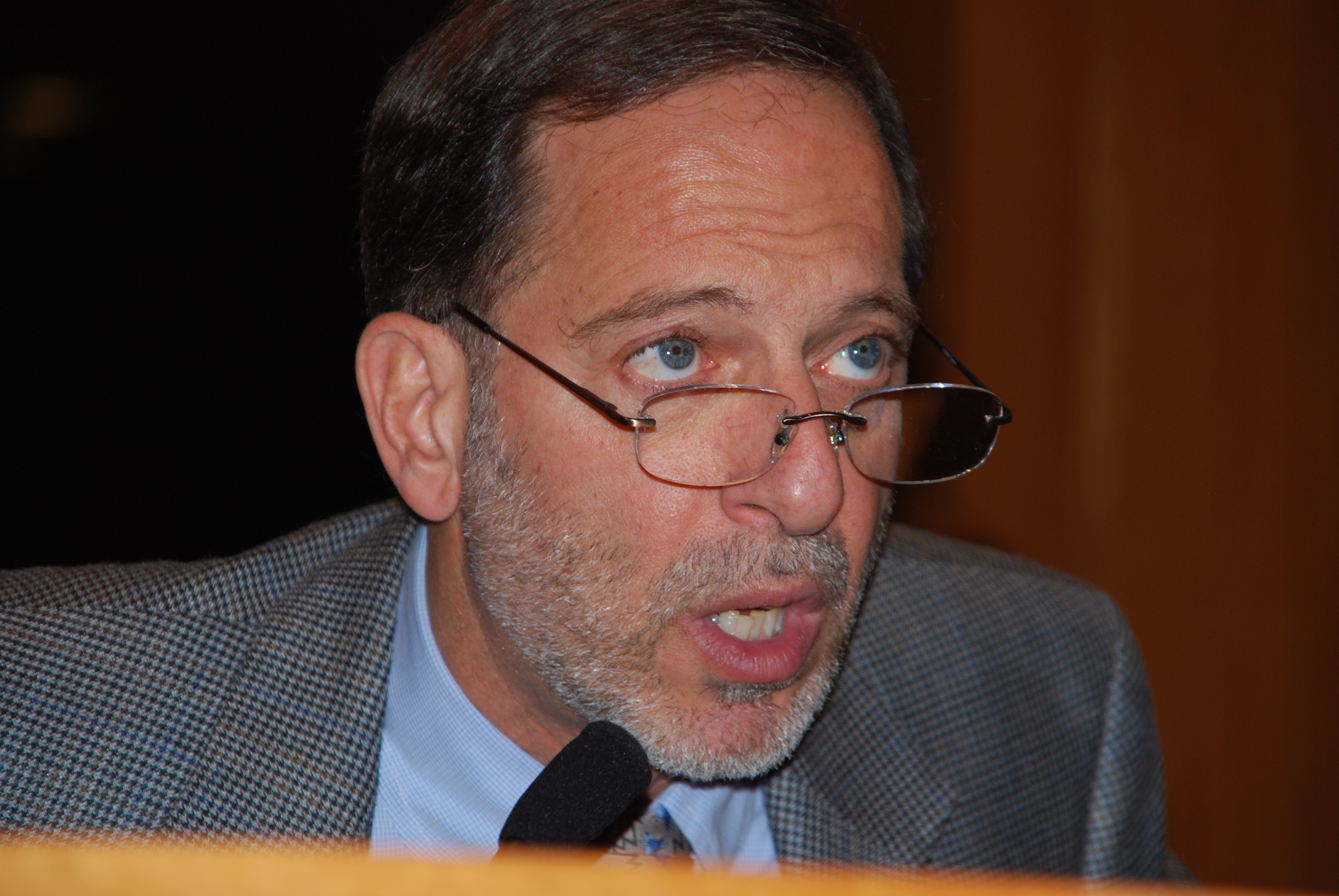
- Khalidi in 2009
- Born: Rashid Ismail Khalidi; November 18, 1948 (age 77); New York City, U.S.
- Spouse: Mona Khalidi (m. 1972)
- Children: Lamya Khalidi; Dima Khalidi; Ismail Khalidi
- Parent(s): Ismail Khalidi (father); Selwa Khalidi (mother)
- Awards: See § Honors and awards

Academic background
- Education: Yale University (BA, 1970); Oxford University (DPhil, 1974)
- Thesis: British policy towards Syria & Palestine, 1906-1914 (1974 (Note: Published by St Antony's College at Oxford's Middle East Centre in 1980.))

Academic work
- Discipline: History
- Institutions: Lebanese University; University of Chicago; Columbia University; Georgetown University; American University of Beirut
- Main interests: Nationalism and colonialism in Palestine and the Middle East
- Notable works: Resurrecting Empire (2005); Palestinian Identity (2009); The Iron Cage (2007); Sowing Crisis (2010); Brokers of Deceit (2014); The Hundred Years' War on Palestine (2020)

Rashid Ismail Khalidi (Arabic: رشيد خالدي; born November 18, 1948) is a Palestinian-American historian of the Middle East and the Edward Said Professor Emeritus of Modern Arab Studies at Columbia University. He served as editor of the Journal of Palestine Studies from 2002 until 2020, when he became co-editor with Sherene Seikaly.

Khalidi has written several books, including The Hundred Years' War on Palestine and Palestinian Identity: The Construction of Modern National Consciousness; has served as president of the Middle East Studies Association of North America; and has taught at the Lebanese University, the American University of Beirut, Georgetown University, and the University of Chicago. He retired from Columbia University on October 8, 2024.

== Family, education and career ==
Khalidi was born in New York City. He is the son of Ismail Khalidi and nephew of Husayin al-Khalidi. He is the father of playwright Ismail Khalidi and activist/attorney Dima Khalidi. He grew up in New York City, where his father, a Saudi citizen of Palestinian origin who was born in Jerusalem, worked for the United Nations. Khalidi's mother, a Lebanese-American, was an interior decorator. Khalidi attended the United Nations International School.

In 1970, Khalidi received a B.A. from Yale University, where he was a member of the Wolf's Head Society. He then received a D.Phil. from Oxford University in 1974. Between 1976 and 1983, Khalidi "was teaching full time as an Assistant Professor in the Political Studies and Public Administration Dept. at the American University of Beirut, published two books and several articles, and also was a research fellow at the independent Institute for Palestine Studies". He has also taught at the Lebanese University.

Khalidi became politically active in Beirut, where he resided through the 1982 Lebanon War. "I was deeply involved in politics in Beirut" in the 1970s, he said in an interview. Khalidi was cited in the media during this period, sometimes as an official with the Palestinian News Service, Wafa, or directly with the Palestine Liberation Organization. Khalidi has said that he was not a PLO spokesman, and that he "often spoke to journalists in Beirut, who usually cited me without attribution as a well-informed Palestinian source. If some misidentified me at the time, I am not aware of it." Subsequently, sources disagreed on the nature or existence of Khalidi's relationship with the organization.

Returning to the US, Khalidi taught at Columbia University from 1985 to 1987. Then he joined the faculty of the University of Chicago, where he spent eight years as a professor and director of both the Center for Middle Eastern Studies and the Center for International Studies at the University of Chicago. During the Gulf War, while teaching at Chicago, Khalidi emerged "as one of the most influential commentators from within Middle Eastern Studies". In 2003, he rejoined the faculty of Columbia University, where he served as the Edward Said Professor of Modern Arab Studies. He has also taught at Georgetown University.

Khalidi is married to Mona Khalidi, who served as assistant dean of student affairs and the assistant director of graduate studies of the School of International and Public Affairs at Columbia University. He is a member of the National Advisory Committee of the U.S. Interreligious Committee for Peace in the Middle East, which describes itself as "a national organization of Jews, Christians and Muslims dedicated to dialogue, education and advocacy for peace based on the deepest teachings of the three religious traditions".

Khalidi is a member of the Board of Sponsors of The Palestine–Israel Journal, a publication founded by Ziad Abuzayyad and Victor Cygielman, prominent Palestinian and Israeli journalists. He is founding trustee of The Center for Palestine Research and Studies. He is also a member of the Council on Foreign Relations.

In October 2010, Khalidi delivered the annual Edward Said memorial lecture at the Palestine Center in Washington.

== Academic work ==
Khalidi's research primarily covers the history of the modern Middle East. He focuses on the countries of the Southern and Eastern Mediterranean, with an eye to the emergence of various national identities and the role played by external powers in their development. He also researches the impact of the media, the role of education in the construction of political identity, and the way regional narratives have developed over the past centuries. Michael C. Hudson, director of the Center for Contemporary Arab Studies at Georgetown, has called Khalidi "preeminent in his field". He served as president of the Middle East Studies Association of North America in 1994 and is co-editor of the Journal of Palestine Studies with Sherene Seikaly.

Much of Khalidi's scholarly work in the 1990s focused on the historical construction of nationalism in the Arab world. Drawing on the work of theorist Benedict Anderson, who described nations as "imagined communities", he does not posit primordial national identities, but argues that these nations have legitimacy and rights. In Palestinian Identity: The Construction of Modern National Consciousness (1997), he places the emergence of Palestinian national identity in the context of Ottoman and British colonialism as well as the early Zionist effort in the Levant. Palestinian Identity won the Middle East Studies Association's top honor, the Albert Hourani Book Award, as the best book of 1997.

Khalidi's dating of the emergence of Palestinian nationalism to the early 20th century and his tracing of its contours provide a rejoinder to Israeli nationalist claims that Palestinians had no collective claims until the 1948 creation of Israel. Palestinian Identity: The Construction of Modern National Consciousness argues that Arabs living in Palestine began to regard themselves as a distinct people decades before 1948 "and that the struggle against Zionism does not by itself sufficiently explain Palestinian nationalism". The book also describes the late development, failings, and internal divisions within various elements of the Palestinian nationalist movement.

In Resurrecting Empire: Western Footprints and America's Perilous Path in the Middle East (2004), Khalidi follows the history of Western involvement in the Middle East, and describes it as colonialist. He finds this morally unacceptable and likely to backfire. His book Sowing Crisis, places the United States' approach to the Middle East in historical context. He is sharply critical of U.S. policies during the Cold War, writing that policies "formulated to oppose the Soviets consistently undermined democracy and exacerbated tensions in the Middle East".

Khalidi has written, "It may seem hard to believe today, but for decades the United States was in fact a major patron, indeed in some respects the major patron, of earlier incarnations" of radical, militant Islam, in order to use all possible resources in waging the Cold War:

The Cold War was over, but its tragic sequels, its toxic debris, and its unexploded mines continued to cause great harm, in ways largely unrecognized in American discourse.

Historian and Israeli Ambassador to the United States Michael Oren has said that "Khalidi is [considered] mainstream" only because "the stream itself has changed. The criteria for scholarship have become very political."

=== Palestinian Identity ===
In Palestinian Identity: The Construction of Modern National Consciousness (1997), Khalidi argues that a Palestinian national consciousness emerged in the beginning of the 20th century. He describes the Arab population as having "overlapping identities", with some or many expressing loyalty to villages, regions, a projected nation of Palestine, an alternative of inclusion in a Greater Syria, an Arab national project, or Islam. Khalidi writes, "Local patriotism could not yet be described as nation-state nationalism."

Khalidi's work emphasizes that the Palestinian identity had been fundamentally fluid and changing, woven from multiple "narratives" due to individual and family experiences. He says the identity developed organically after Zionist immigrant pressure forced peasants from their homes, but that Palestinian nationalism is also far more complex than merely an anti-Zionist reaction. Praise for his book appeared in the journal Foreign Affairs, with reviewer William B. Quandt calling it "a major contribution to historical understanding of Palestinian nationalism."

Khalidi also documents the Arab press's active opposition to Zionism in the 1880s.

=== The Iron Cage: The Story of the Palestinian Struggle for Statehood ===
In 2006, Khalidi published The Iron Cage: The Story of the Palestinian Struggle for Statehood, which critically examines the Palestinian struggle for statehood during the British Mandate. It highlights both the failures of Palestinian leadership and British and Zionist roles in hindering statehood for Palestine.

== Public life ==
Khalidi has published dozens of scholarly articles on Middle East history and politics, as well as op-ed pieces in many U.S. newspapers. He has also been a guest on radio and TV shows, including All Things Considered, Talk of the Nation, Morning Edition, Worldview, The News Hour with Jim Lehrer, Charlie Rose, and Nightline, and appeared on the BBC, the CBC, France Inter and the Voice of America. He served as president of the American Committee on Jerusalem, now known as the American Task Force on Palestine, and from 1991 to 1993 served as an official advisor to the joint Jordanian-Palestinian delegation—later transitioning to the Palestinian Liberation Organization (PLO) delegation—during the Middle East peace conference in Madrid and the ensuing Israeli-Palestinian-American negotiations in Washington.

=== Views on Israeli–Palestinian conflict ===
Khalidi has written that the establishment of the state of Israel resulted in "the uprooting of the world's oldest and most secure Jewish communities, which had found in the Arab lands a tolerance that, albeit imperfect, was nonexistent in the often genocidal, Jew-hating Christian West." Of the proposed two-state solution to the Israeli–Palestinian conflict, Khalidi has written, "the now universally applauded two-state solution faces the juggernaut of Israel's actions in the occupied territories over more than forty years, actions that have been expressly designed to make its realization in any meaningful form impossible." Khalidi has noted that "there are also flaws in the alternatives, grouped under the rubric of the one-state solution".

Khalidi supports the Boycott, Divestment and Sanctions movement.

Of American support for Israel, Khalidi said in an interview, "every other single place on the face of the earth is in support of the Palestinians, yet all of them together aren't a hill of beans compared to the United States and Israel, because the United States and Israel can basically do anything they please. They are the world superpower, they are the regional superpower."

A New York Sun editorial criticized Khalidi for saying there is a legal right under international law for Palestinians to resist what Khalidi considers Israeli occupation. For example, in a speech to the American-Arab Anti-Discrimination Committee, Khalidi said: "Killing civilians is a war crime. It's a violation of international law. They are not soldiers. They're civilians, they're unarmed. The ones who are armed, the ones who are soldiers, the ones who are in occupation—that's different. That's resistance." The Sun editorial argued that by failing to distinguish between Palestinian combatants and noncombatants, Khalidi implied that all Palestinians have this right to resist, which it claimed was incorrect under international law. In an interview about the editorial, Khalidi called this characterization incorrect and said the Sun took his statements on international law out of context.

Khalidi has described discussions of Arab restitution for property confiscated from the Jewish refugees from Middle Eastern and North African countries after the creation of Israel as "insidious", "because the advocates of Jewish refugees are not working to get those legitimate assets back but are in fact trying to cancel out the debt of Israel toward Palestinian refugees".

=== NYC teacher training program ===
In 2005 Khalidi's participation in a New York City teacher training program was ended by the city's schools chancellor, Joel I. Klein, who wrote: "Considering his past statements, Rashid Khalidi should not have been included in a program that provided professional development for Department of Education teachers and he won't be participating in the future." Columbia University president Lee Bollinger spoke out on Khalidi's behalf, writing: "The department's decision to dismiss Professor Khalidi from the program was wrong and violates First Amendment principles... The decision was based solely on his purported political views and was made without any consultation and apparently without any review of the facts."

=== 2008 U.S. presidential campaign ===
After the Los Angeles Times published an article about Barack Obama's attendance at a 2003 farewell dinner for Khalidi, their relationship became an issue in the campaign. Some of Obama's opponents said the relationship between him and Khalidi was evidence that Obama would not maintain a pro-Israel foreign policy if elected. Obama called his commitment to Israel "unshakeable" and said he did not consult with Khalidi on foreign policy.

=== Retirement from Columbia ===
Khalidi announced his retirement from Columbia University in June 2024. The process was finalized in October 2024. In an interview with The Guardian, Khalidi cited the university's crackdown on pro-Palestinian student protests, which he had vocally supported, and the transformation of the university into a "hedge fund-cum-real estate operation, with a minor sideline in education" as reasons for his retirement.

Although formally retired, Khalidi was due to offer his course History of the Modern Middle East at Columbia as a special lecturer in fall 2025, but canceled it, citing Columbia's adoption of the IHRA definition of antisemitism in its settlement with the Trump administration.

== Opposition to U.S. embassy plan ==
On 18 January 1989, the Israeli and U.S. governments signed an agreement to lease a 7.7-acre plot in West Jerusalem to the United States. The land formed part of the 13-acre Allenby Barracks site, which had belonged to Palestinian families before Israeli authorities confiscated it in 1950 under the Absentees' propert law. The site was designated for the construction of a U.S. embassy in Jerusalem. Khalidi said he is a descendant of the owners of the land and that the embassy's construction violated both international law and his rights as a U.S. citizen. In 2026, he told +972 Magazine that he had opposed the plan for over 30 years. In 2022, then deputy mayor of Jerusalem Fleur Hassan-Nahoum said Khalidi's claims were "based on denying the validity of Israeli law". The plan to begin construction was signed on July 1, 2026.

== Honors and awards ==
=== Academic ===
- 2007: Lenfest Teaching Award
- 2018: World Congress for Middle Eastern Studies (WOCMES) Seville Award for Outstanding Contribution to Middle Eastern Studies
- 2024: Honorary Fellow of St Antony's College, Oxford University
- 2025: Caribbean Philosophical Association Frantz Fanon Lifetime Achievement Award

=== Books ===
- 1997: Middle East Studies Association (MESA) Albert Hourani Book Award for Palestinian Identity
- 2004: MESA Albert Hourani Book Award for Resurrecting Empire
- 2007: Arab American Book Award
- 2013: Palestine Book Awards
- 2014: Lionel Trilling Book Award

== Bibliography ==
=== Books ===
==== Author ====
- Under Siege: PLO Decision-making during the 1982 War. Columbia University Press. 1986.
- Palestinian Identity: The Construction of Modern National Consciousness. Columbia University Press. 1997.
- Resurrecting Empire: Western Footprints and America's Perilous Path in the Middle East. Beacon Press. 2004.
- The Iron Cage: The Story of the Palestinian Struggle for Statehood. Beacon Press. 2006. ISBN 978-0-8070-0308-4.
- Sowing Crisis: The Cold War and American Dominance in the Middle East. Beacon Press. 2009.
- Brokers of Deceit: How the U.S. Has Undermined Peace in the Middle East. Beacon Press. 2013. ISBN 978-08070-4475-9.
- The Hundred Years' War on Palestine: A History of Settler Colonialism and Resistance, 1917–2017. Metropolitan Books. 2020. ISBN 978-1-627-79855-6.

==== Editor ====
- Palestine and the Gulf. Co-editor. Institute for Palestine Studies. 1982.
- The Origins of Arab Nationalism. Co-editor. Columbia University Press. 1991.

=== Essays ===
- British Policy towards Syria and Palestine, 1906–1914. Ithaca Press for St. Antony's College. 1980.
- Rogan, Eugene L.; Shlaim, Avi, eds. (2007) [1st ed. 2001]. "The Palestinians and 1948: the underlying causes of failure". The War for Palestine: Rewriting the History of 1948 (2nd ed.). Cambridge University Press. ISBN 978-0-521-69934-1.
