= Alleged U.S. funding of anti-Netanyahu NGOs during the Biden administration =

Alleged use of U.S. funds to support Israeli protest groups

Alleged U.S. funding of anti-Netanyahu NGOs
- Part of United States–Israel relations
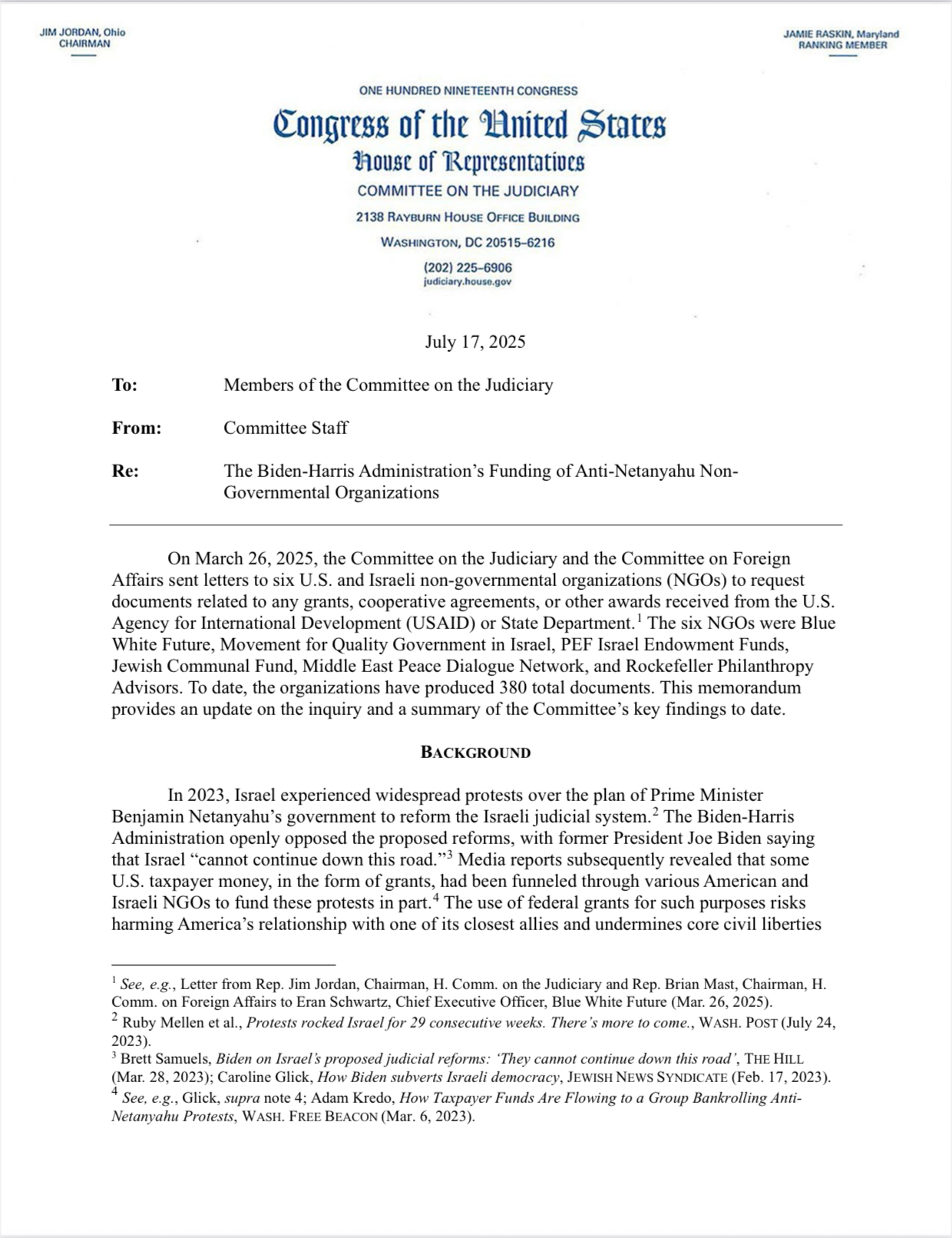
- First page of the memorandum by the United States House Committee on the Judiciary (July 17, 2025), describing the alleged use of U.S. taxpayer funds to finance protests against the Government of Israel through NGOs
- Date: March 2025 – present
- Location: United States and Israel
- Type: Political controversy, Congressional investigation
- Cause: Alleged use of U.S. federal funds to support Israeli protest groups
- Participants: U.S. House Judiciary Committee; U.S. House Foreign Affairs Committee; Israeli NGOs (e.g. MQG, BWF); U.S.-based nonprofits (e.g. PEF, MEPDN, JCF)
- Outcome: Investigation ongoing (as of July 2025)
- Key allegations: Misuse of taxpayer funds, foreign interference, violation of nonprofit law

2023 Israeli judicial reform protests

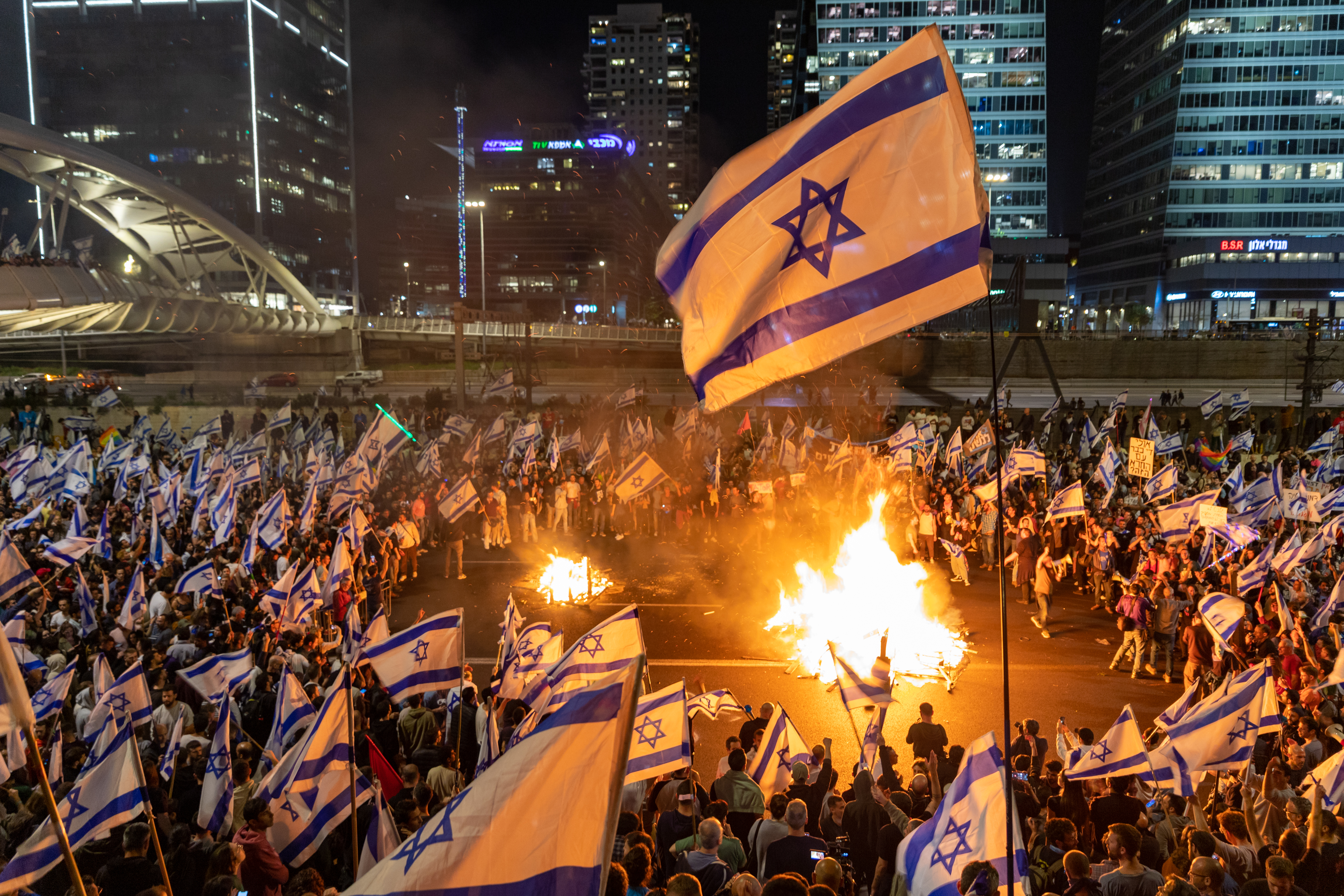
Mass protests in Ayalon on March 26, 2023, after Netanyahu fired Gallant

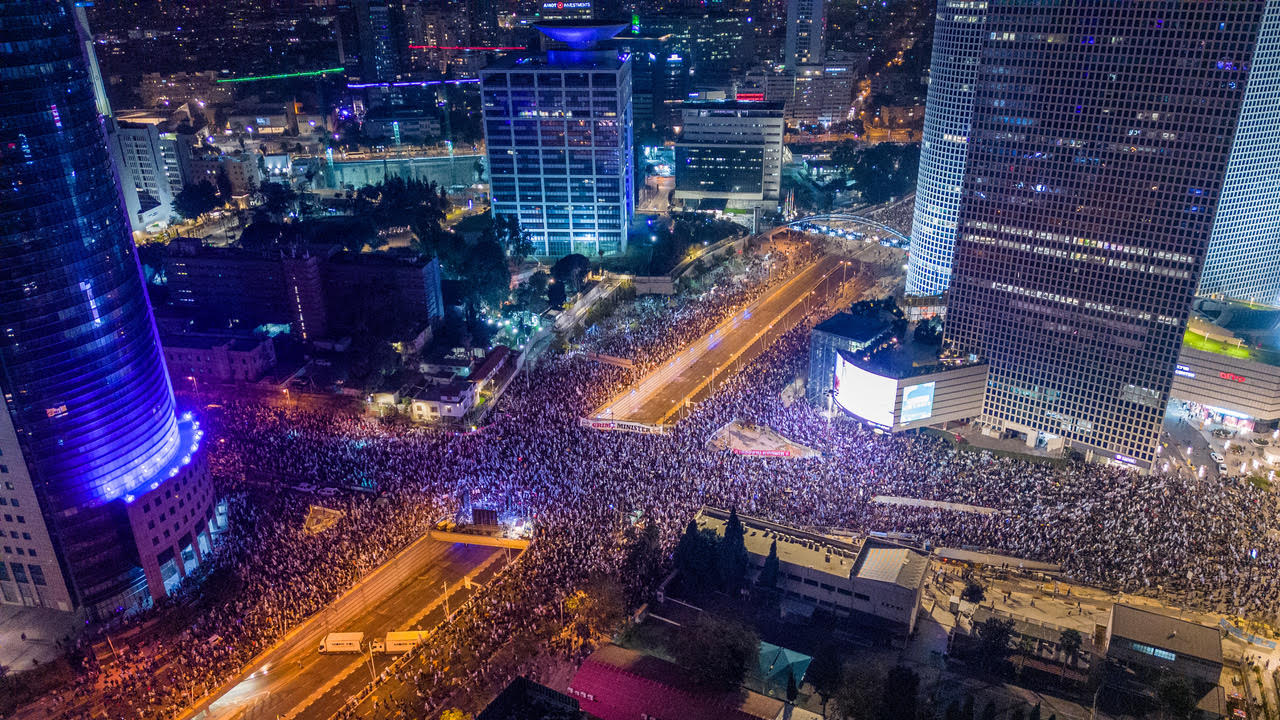
Protest against the judicial reform near Tel Aviv's Azrieli Center on March 4, 2023

Alleged U.S. funding of anti-Netanyahu NGOs during the Biden administration refers to an inquiry initiated by the House Judiciary and Foreign Affairs Committees in March 2025. The investigation aims to examine the use of funds from USAID and the U.S. Department of State under the administration of President Joe Biden and Vice President Kamala Harris to support non-governmental organizations (NGOs) involved in protests against judicial reform and the government of Benjamin Netanyahu. The memorandum released on July 17, 2025, alleges that NGOs such as Blue White Future and the Movement for Quality Government received millions of dollars through American-based foundations. According to Israeli Prime Minister Benjamin Netanyahu and the Likud party, this constituted “massive foreign interference” intended to undermine his right-wing government. The investigation also raises concerns about links between some of the funded NGOs and terrorist organizations such as Hamas and the Popular Front for the Liberation of Palestine (PFLP).

== Background ==
In 2023, Israel experienced widespread protests against a series of judicial reforms proposed by Prime Minister Benjamin Netanyahu. The reforms were criticized as undermining judicial independence.

The Biden administration publicly opposed the reforms, and media reports later suggested that U.S. taxpayer funds, distributed via agencies such as the U.S. State Department and USAID, may have been used to support these protest movements. In March 2025, the House Judiciary and House Foreign Affairs Committees launched an investigation, requesting records from six NGOs. The July 2025 committee memo summarized the initial findings.

== Investigated organizations ==
=== Blue White Future (BWF) ===
BWF is an Israeli NGO advocating for a two-state solution. This organization allegedly received hundreds of millions of NIS via U.S.-linked intermediaries, particularly the Middle East Peace Dialogue Network (MEPDN) and PEF Israel Endowment Funds. BWF ostensibly supported protest headquarters during the judicial crisis and referred to Netanyahu's government as a dictatorship. The committee raised concerns over violations of Israeli NGO transparency regulations.

=== Movement for Quality Government in Israel ===
Movement for Quality Government in Israel is a long-standing Israeli civil society organization promoting democratic governance. It received approximately $42,000 in U.S. State Department grants between 2020 and 2022 for a "Civic Activism Training" program in Jerusalem schools. The curriculum included protest rights, whistleblowing, and civic activism. Critics claimed this constituted foreign political interference aimed at shaping Israeli youth opinion.

=== U.S.-based financial intermediaries ===
==== PEF Israel Endowment Funds ====
PEF served as a major U.S. donation channel to Israeli NGOs. It allegedly directed hundreds of millions of NIS to protest-related organizations and is criticized for lack of donor transparency and oversight.

==== Jewish Communal Fund ====
Jewish Communal Fund is a donor-advised fund manager based in New York. It reported to have transferred over $42 million to Israeli protest organizers. The committee raised concerns over oversight and compliance with U.S. nonprofit laws.

==== Middle East Peace Dialogue Network ====
Middle East Peace Dialogue Network is a U.S. nonprofit organization controlled by donor Hillel Schenker. It is accused of circumventing Israeli law to fund political activism and mass protests, and therefore, allegedly in violation of U.S. rules governing 501(c)(3) organizations political activities.

==== Rockefeller Philanthropy Advisors ====
Rockefeller Philanthropy Advisors is a fiscal sponsor and nonprofit consultancy managing federal grants. It allegedly received over $30 million in federal funds. Allegedly, some funds were reportedly redirected to groups affiliated with the Israeli protest movement, raising concerns over misuse of U.S. taxpayer money.

== Possible links to extremist groups ==
The memo references concerns that some funded NGOs may have indirect ties to organizations or individuals associated with extremist or terrorist activity. It raises questions about potential violations of U.S. anti-terror funding restrictions, though no formal conclusions have been drawn.

== Committee conclusions ==
The committee alleges that the Biden-Harris administration misused U.S. taxpayer funds to interfere in Israel's domestic politics. It characterizes the funding as a form of indirect support for civil unrest and opposition to a democratically elected government. The memo frames this as both a breach of U.S. nonprofit regulations and a violation of Israeli sovereignty.

== Current status ==
As of July 2025 the investigation remains ongoing. Additional document requests, subpoenas, and hearings are expected. No legal action or criminal referrals have been issued as of July 2025, though further scrutiny of State Department and USAID grant disbursements is anticipated.

== Reception and criticism ==
Republican lawmakers described the memo as evidence of ideological interference by the Biden administration. Democratic lawmakers dismissed the probe as politically motivated and lacking substantive evidence.

NGOs named in the report denied wrongdoing, asserting their programs complied with legal standards and supported democratic engagement. The NGOs mentioned in the report denies the accusations: BWF CEO Rotem Perelman-Farhi pushed back on the committee's accusations: Blue White Future declared that it "categorically rejects the false and groundless allegations concerning its funding and activities." and claimed that "No state entity, administration, or government body — American or otherwise (USAID included) — has ever provided funding to the organization." JCF declared that it will cooperate with the committee, but does not agree with its latest memo.

== See also ==
- United States–Israel relations
