= Rasmea Odeh =

Palestinian-American activist

Rasmea Yousef Odeh
- Born: 1947/1948 (age 78–79); Lifta, British Mandate Palestine
- Other names: Rasmea Yousef, Rasmieh Steve, Rasmieh Joseph Steve, Rasmieh Odeh, Rasmieh Yousef Odeh
- Occupations: Associate director of the Arab American Action Network, Chicago, Illinois
- Convictions: a) Yes (life sentence) (b) 18 months in federal prison, stripping of US citizenship, and deportation from US to Jordan, once she has served her sentence, conviction was vacated by the appellate court.
- Criminal charges: a) Involvement in two terrorist bombings in Jerusalem, including a fatal one; b) Immigration fraud

Details
- Country: Israel
- Targets: Jerusalem supermarket and British Consulate
- Killed: 2
- Injured: 9
- Weapon: Bombs
- Imprisoned at: Sentenced to life imprisonment, served ten years in Israel; In custody November 10 – December 11, 2014, in Michigan, but freed on bond pending sentencing; sentenced to 18 months in federal prison on March 12, 2015.

Rasmea Yousef Odeh (in Arabic رسمية يوسف عودة; born 1948), also known as Rasmea Yousef, Rasmieh Steve, and Rasmieh Joseph Steve, is a Palestinian Jordanian and former American citizen who was a member of the Popular Front for the Liberation of Palestine (PFLP) convicted by Israeli military courts for involvement in a 1969 Jerusalem supermarket bombing which killed two young civilians. She was sentenced to life in prison and spent 10 years there before being released in a 1980 prisoner exchange with the PFLP. After her release to Jordan, she immigrated in 1990 to the United States, became a U.S. citizen, and served as associate director at the Arab American Action Network in Chicago, Illinois.

In 2014, Odeh was convicted of immigration fraud by a jury in federal court in Detroit for concealing her Israeli arrest and conviction. Odeh's counsel maintained she did not receive a "full and fair trial" because the judge ruled as irrelevant her testimony that her 1969 confession in Israel had been extracted by torture. In 2015, a federal judge denied Odeh's request to either overturn the conviction or grant a new trial, ruling that her argument lacked legal merit, based on evidence of her fraudulent citizenship application and the fact that the jurors "clearly did not believe [her] explanation", while "the evidence was more than sufficient to support the jury's verdict." Odeh was sentenced to 18 months in federal prison in March 2015, stripped of her US citizenship, and set for deportation to Jordan after serving her time. Her conviction was vacated by the 6th Circuit Court of Appeals and sent back to the District Court in February 2016. In April 2017 she pleaded guilty to failing to disclose her previous conviction on her citizenship application. As part of the plea agreement she was deported without serving jail time.

== Early life ==
Odeh has said that she was born in Lifta in 1948, but that her family left for Ramallah when she was a month old. Her father Yousef emigrated to the United States in the 1950s, leaving his wife, son, and 5 daughters in Ramallah. (Note: In Women in Struggle (2004) at 24:16, Odeh says that she has no childhood memories of her father.) She began attending communist meetings at the age of 12, joining the Arab Nationalist Movement at 13. Her father returned in 1967 after breaking his leg in a work accident. She "became convinced that military action was more important than social or political work" after the Six-Day War, throwing stones at Israelis and training to fire guns.

== Conviction and imprisonment by Israel ==
In December 1968 Odeh left for Lebanon to register at Beirut Arab University, intending to study political economy and train with the PFLP there, and then for Amman, where Wadie Haddad gave her a letter of introduction to Bashir al-Khairi. She returned to Ramallah on December 31 (Note: According to her 1969 testimony, but in the 1980 interview she says "early 1969".) and went to al-Khairi's office to receive explosives. Odeh and Rashida Abdel-Hamid Ebeido scouted the supermarket location on February 11, purchasing some items (the receipts of which were found in her home), (Note: According to her written confession, but at the trial she said that she had never met Rashida or entered the supermarket. Rashida escaped to Jordan and gave a press conference in June 1969 in which she claimed to be solely responsible for the bombings.) and Haddad met with Rasmea and Aisha Odeh (no relation) on February 20 to help assemble the bombs.

According to Odeh,

I . . . was arrested on February 28 and accused of involvement in the supermarket explosion in West Jerusalem and another in the British consulate. We had placed a bomb there to protest Britain's decision to furnish arms to Israel. Actually we placed two bombs, the first was found before it went off so we placed another. The intention was not to hurt people but to remind the world that Palestinians existed, to reassert ourselves and to show that we couldn't accept the occupation and Western connivance in silence.

On February 21, 1969, one of the bombs killed 21-year-old Leon Kanner and 22-year-old Eddie Joffe, students who stopped in to buy groceries for a field trip, and wounded 9 others, and on February 25 another damaged the British Consulate. The PFLP took credit for both bombings and Israeli police found extensive bomb-making materials, grenades, explosive bricks, receipts from the supermarket, and a manifesto in Odeh's room.

Odeh was arrested in March 1969, confessed to investigators, and in 1970 was convicted and sentenced by an Israeli military court to life in prison for her perpetration of the two terrorist bombings in Jerusalem and for her involvement in the PFLP, an illegal organization. Guy Wintelir, a Red Cross observer who attended her entire trial, said that "the bench ha[s] given the accused every chance of defending themselves and the trial was a fair trial".

Odeh claimed in 1975 that her trial and imprisonment were a case of political detention, and that she had suffered torture and rape. These claims were published by a Sunday Times special investigation team in 1979. She claimed that prison officials had stripped her naked and asked her father to have intercourse with her, at which point he fainted, and that only this had caused her to confess. However, American prosecutors concluded that these claims were "certainly false" and that "the claimed torture did not happen". In 1969, the US Consul General in Jerusalem, Stephen James Campbell, visited her father in prison to check on his condition, and reported to Washington that Yousef Odeh had "complain[ed] of uncomfortable, overcrowded jail conditions", but was otherwise receiving "no worse than standard treatment". In a 1980 interview, Odeh described participating in the bombing. She also did not deny her involvement in Women in Struggle (2004), instead reminiscing with Aisha Odeh about their respective roles, and these statements correspond precisely to her 1969 confession.

In 1980, Odeh was among 78 prisoners released by Israel in an exchange with the PFLP for one Israeli soldier captured in Lebanon.

== Entry into US; application for citizenship ==
In 1995, Odeh entered the United States from Jordan. At the time, according to her later federal indictment, she stated she had no criminal record. The U.S. Attorney in the Eastern District of Michigan said: "An individual convicted of a terrorist bombing would not be admitted to the United States if that information was known at the time of arrival." In 2004, Odeh applied to become a United States citizen. According to her indictment, on her immigration forms, she again answered "no" as to whether she had received any criminal convictions or served any time in prison; her defense attorneys claimed that she understood the form to be referring to her time in the United States.

Jennifer Williams, the Detroit immigration officer who interviewed Odeh in 2004, testified that she makes a point of clarifying to applicants that the question applies to convictions "anywhere in the world." Odeh would later testify that Williams had not done so in her case. Odeh was sworn in as a naturalized US citizen under the name "Rasmieh Joseph Steve" on December 9, 2004. She initially lived in Jackson, Michigan.

She appeared in the 2004 documentary Women in Struggle by Buthina Canaan Khoury, about four Palestinian women imprisoned in Israeli jails, which her opponents say provide evidence of her involvement in the bombings, as her co-conspirator Aisha Odeh freely implicated Rasmea Odeh in the bombing. She became associate director of the Arab American Action Network in Chicago.

== Conviction for immigration fraud in the US ==
Odeh was indicted on October 17, 2013, for concealing her arrest, conviction, and imprisonment in her application, and for lying as to where she had lived previously. She was arrested five days later at her home in Evergreen Park, Illinois, in the Chicago area.

In May 2014, Odeh rejected a pre-trial offer from federal prosecutors that would have limited any prison sentence to a maximum of six months and, after that, allowed her to remain free (for a maximum of six months) until her deportation. She said she felt it was not in her best interest, and preferred the case to go to trial.

In August 2014, the first judge assigned to the case, federal district court Judge Paul Borman, recused himself after he learned that his family was part owners in the supermarket that had been bombed in 1969. He stated that his financial ties "could be perceived as establishing a reasonably objective inference of a lack of impartiality in the context of the issues presented in this case." Odeh's lawyers had earlier requested that he step down because he had received an award from the Jewish Federation of Metropolitan Detroit for supporting Israel, that his family had fundraised for a pro-Israeli charity, and that he had made many trips to Israel. He said that Odeh's lawyers were engaged in "careless and rank speculation" for suggesting that he could not be impartial in the case, stating that "a judge’s prior activities relating to his religious convictions are not a valid basis for questioning his impartiality in a particular case". He noted that some of the material brought forward applied to his cousin rather than himself.

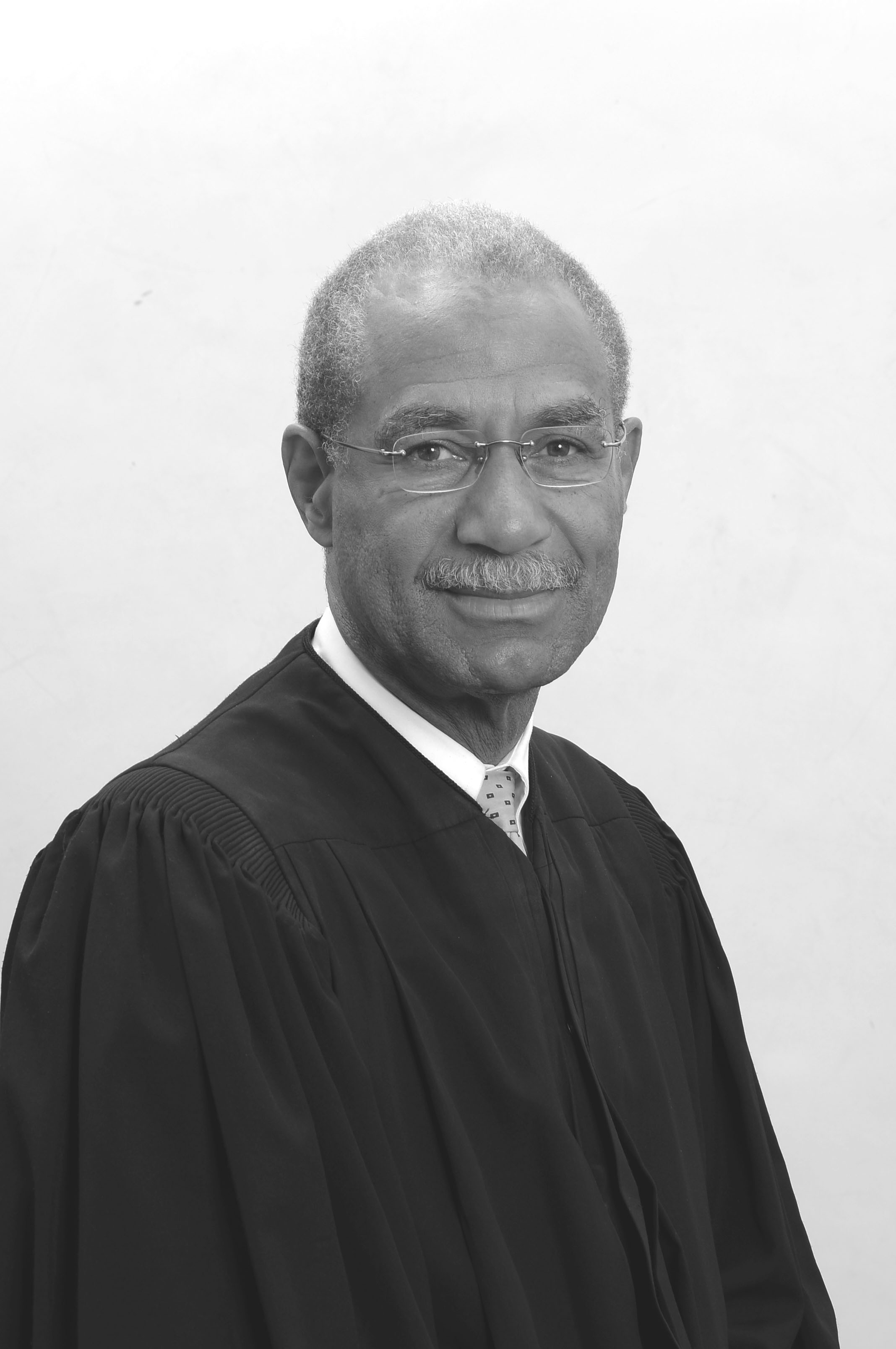
Judge Gershwin A. Drain

Odeh was tried in November 2014 for immigration fraud before a federal jury in Detroit, Michigan, with Judge Gershwin A. Drain presiding. She was accused of concealing her 1969–70 arrest, conviction, and imprisonment when she filed US immigration papers. Odeh was also accused of lying in her immigration papers about her prior residency, falsely claiming that she had lived only in Jordan from 1948 until her application.

Before trial, her defense argued that Odeh had been tortured while in prison, and suffered from posttraumatic stress disorder. Judge Drain ruled that evidence on these matters were irrelevant to whether Odeh lied on her immigration documents, and disallowed testimony on these topics.

Odeh was convicted of immigration fraud in federal court in Detroit on November 10, 2014, for concealing her prior arrest, conviction, and imprisonment. The jury deliberated for two hours before rendering its verdict. Judge Drain told the jury: "I think your verdict is a fair and reasonable one based on the evidence that came in."

She had her bail revoked and was taken into custody upon the conclusion of her trial, as the judge found her to be a flight risk, and was incarcerated in Port Huron, Michigan. On December 8, Judge Drain agreed to allow her to be released on a $50,000 cash bond, pending sentencing, which was effected on December 11, 2014. On February 13, 2015, Judge Drain denied Odeh's request that he either overturn the federal jury's conviction of her or grant her a new trial, ruling that her argument lacked legal merit. The judge held that evidence showed that Odeh illegally obtained U.S. citizenship, the jurors "clearly did not believe [her] explanation", and "the evidence was more than sufficient to support the jury’s verdict." Odeh was sentenced to 18 months in federal prison by Judge Drain on March 12, 2015, and it was announced that she would be stripped of her US citizenship and be deported from the United States to Jordan at the conclusion of her sentence. She was allowed to go free on bail during her appeal.

On February 25, 2016, the United States Court of Appeals for the Sixth Circuit unanimously vacated her conviction of an immigration violation, sending the case back to Judge Drain to reconsider the admissibility of expert testimony. Circuit Judge John M. Rogers, joined partially by Judge Karen Nelson Moore, vacated and remanded, while Judge Alice M. Batchelder partially dissented, wanting to vacate while ordering a new trial. On December 6, 2016, Judge Drain in Detroit denied prosecutors’ request to reinstate Odeh's conviction, instead granting Odeh a new trial, scheduled to begin January 10, 2017.

On March 23, 2017, Rasmea Odeh accepted a plea agreement where she would serve no prison time but would lose her U.S. citizenship and be deported.

On August 17, 2017, Odeh was formally stripped of her US citizenship in a federal court hearing in Detroit before Judge Gershwin Drain. She was subsequently ordered to be deported to Jordan and to pay a $1,000 fine for immigration fraud.

On September 20, 2017, Odeh was deported to Jordan.

== After deportation to Jordan ==
On March 19, 2019, she was banned from speaking at a public meeting marking International Women's Day in Berlin after German officials revoked her Schengen visa. Berlin city officials forced the Dersim Cultural Community Center to cancel the talk (for the Dersim community see Dersim rebellion and Kurdish Alevism). According to Haaretz, Strategic Affairs Minister Gilad Erdan (Likud) issued a statement saying the decision was made thanks to pressure applied by him and "a slew of Jewish organizations in Germany, as well as protest by the Israeli ambassador in Germany."
