= YAF =

YAF may stand for:

- Young Americans for Freedom
- Young America's Foundation
- Young Artists Forum, Palestine
- You Are Free, an album by American singer/songwriter Cat Power

yaf is the ISO 630 code for Yaka language (Congo–Angola).
