= Hundred Years' War (disambiguation) =

Hundred Years' War was a 14th-15th century Anglo-French conflict. It may refer to:

- First Hundred Years' War, 12th–13th century Anglo-French conflict
- Second Hundred Years' War, ca. 18th century Anglo-French conflict
- Hundred Years' Croatian–Ottoman War, the war between the Kingdom of Croatia and the Ottoman Empire
- Xhosa Wars, the series of wars between the Xhosa and British and Dutch colonists

== See also ==
- on different phases of the Hundred Years' War
- The Hundred Years' War on Palestine, 2020 by Rashid Khalidi
- Chola–Chalukya Wars, a series of conflicts in India that lasted over a hundred years (992 to 1120)
- Three Hundred and Thirty Five Years' War, an alleged state of war from 1651 to 1986 between the Netherlands and the Isles of Scilly off the southwest coast of Great Britain
