= Brandy R. McMillion =

American judge (born 1979)

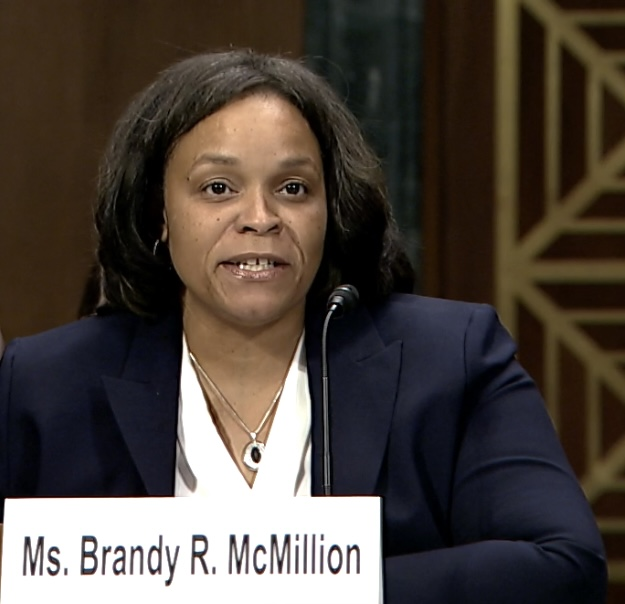

Judge of the United States District Court for the Eastern District of Michigan
- Incumbent
- Assumed office November 13, 2023
- Appointed by: Joe Biden
- Preceded by: Gershwin A. Drain

Personal details
- Born: Brandy Renée Murphy; 1979 (age 46–47) Dayton, Ohio, U.S.
- Education: University of Michigan (BSE, MSE); George Washington University (JD)

Brandy Renée McMillion (née Murphy; born 1979) is an American judge and lawyer from Michigan. She has served as a United States district judge of the United States District Court for the Eastern District of Michigan since 2023. She previously served as an assistant United States attorney of the same court from 2015 to 2023.

== Education ==
McMilion received a her Bachelor of Engineering in 2001 and a Master of Engineering in 2002, both in industrial and operations engineering from the University of Michigan. She received a Juris Doctor from George Washington University Law School in 2006 and graduated with honors and pro bono distinction.

== Career ==
McMillion was an associate at Pepper Hamilton from 2006 to 2007, an associate at Perkins Coie from 2007 to 2012. She was a senior litigation associate at Bryan Cave from 2012 to 2015. She later advocated for the rights of abused and neglected children in the foster care system as a Court Appointed Special Advocate. She served as an assistant United States attorney in the U.S. Attorney's Office for the Eastern District of Michigan from 2015 to 2023; also served as the chief of the office's General Crimes Unit from 2022 to 2023.

=== Federal judicial service ===
On June 28, 2023, President Joe Biden announced his intent to nominate McMillion to serve as a United States district judge of the United States District Court for the Eastern District of Michigan. On July 11, 2023, her nomination was sent to the Senate. President Biden nominated McMillion to the seat vacated by Judge Gershwin A. Drain, who assumed senior status on August 13, 2022. On July 26, 2023, a hearing on her nomination was held before the Senate Judiciary Committee. On September 14, 2023, her nomination was reported out of committee by a 12–9 vote. On November 8, 2023, the United States Senate invoked cloture on her nomination by a 54–44 vote. On November 9, 2023, her nomination was confirmed by a 53–42 vote. She received her judicial commission on November 13, 2023. She was sworn in on November 14, 2023.

== Personal life ==
She is married to Brian McMillion, and they have three children.

== See also ==
- List of African American jurists
- List of African American federal judges

Legal offices
Preceded by Gershwin A. Drain	Judge of the United States District Court for the Eastern District of Michigan; 2023–present	Incumbent
