= Arab American Action Network =

Chicago center for Arab community relations

The Arab American Action Network (AAAN) is a Chicago-based community center founded in 1995 to strengthen the Arab immigrant and Arab American communities in the Chicago area by building their capacity to be active agents for positive social change. As a grassroots nonprofit, its strategies include community organizing, advocacy, education, providing social services, leadership development, cultural outreach, and forging productive relationships with other communities.

Rasmea Odeh, convicted in the 1969 Jerusalem Supermarket bombing is the AAAN's associate director.

Its vision is for a strong Arab American community whose members have the power to make decisions about actions and policies that affect their lives; and have access to a range of social, political, cultural, and economic opportunities in a context of equity and social justice. The organization is a pioneer in domestic violence prevention and intervention, adult education, and youth organizing programming, as well as a strong advocate for women.

The AAAN is the brainchild of a number of leading Arab activists and organizers, including members of its precursor organization, the Arab Community Center; academics and intellectuals; business-people; and former Columbia University School of International and Public Affairs Assistant Dean Mona Khalidi. It is a core member of the Chicago Cultural Alliance, a consortium of 25 ethnic museums and cultural centers in Chicago; the Illinois Coalition for Immigrant and Refugee Rights (ICIRR); the National Network for Arab American Communities (NNAAC); and the Chicago Alliance Against Racist and Political Repression (CAARPR); amongst other coalitions, alliances, and networks.
