= Gershwin A. Drain =

American judge (born 1949)

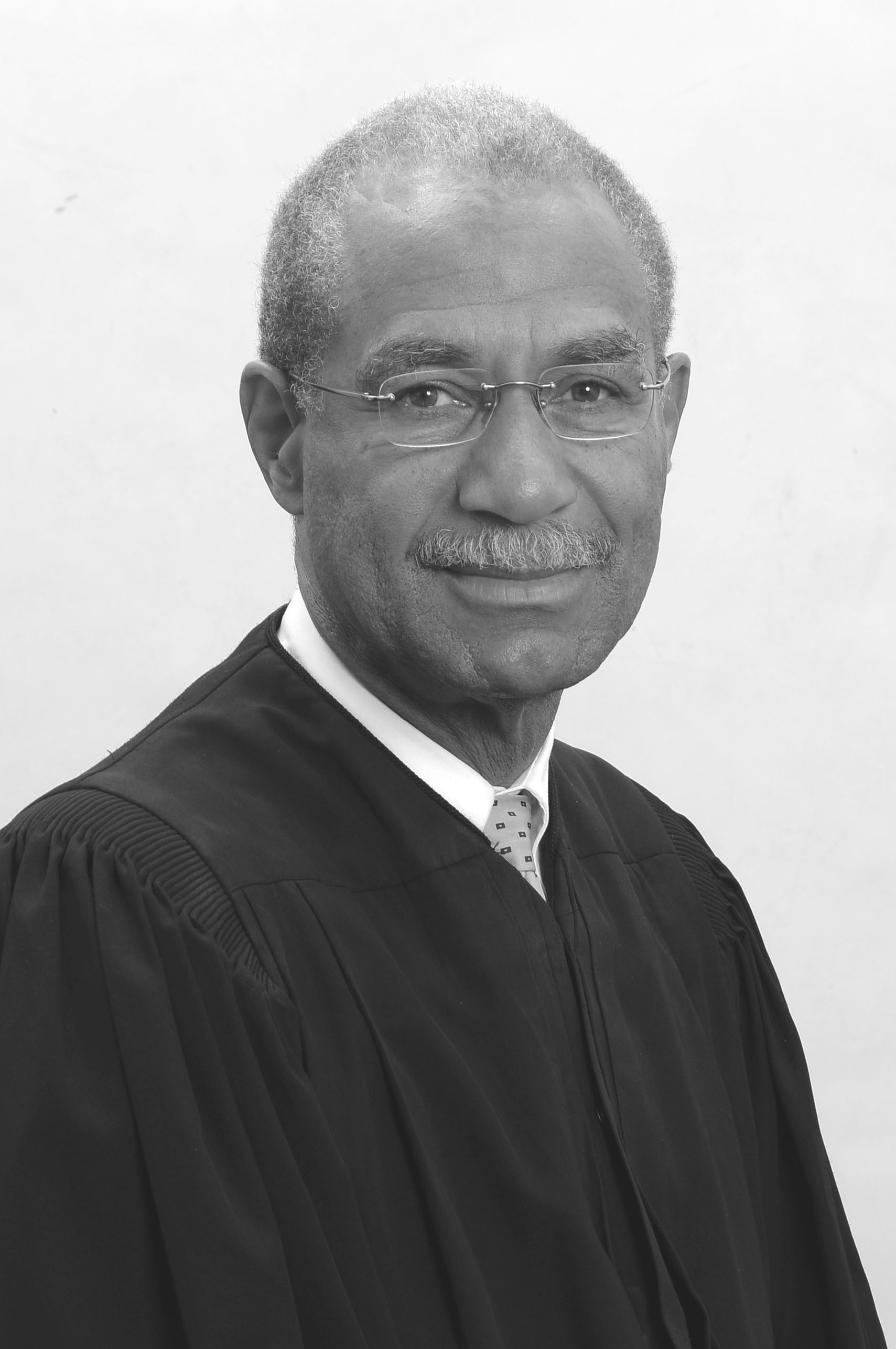

Senior Judge of the United States District Court for the Eastern District of Michigan
- Incumbent
- Assumed office August 13, 2022

Judge of the United States District Court for the Eastern District of Michigan
- In office August 8, 2012 – August 13, 2022
- Appointed by: Barack Obama
- Preceded by: Bernard A. Friedman
- Succeeded by: Brandy R. McMillion

Personal details
- Born: January 24, 1949 (age 77) Detroit, Michigan, U.S.
- Education: Western Michigan University (BS); University of Michigan (JD); University of Nevada-Reno (MJS)

Gershwin Allen Drain (born January 24, 1949) is a senior United States district judge of the United States District Court for the Eastern District of Michigan.

== Early life and education ==
Born in Detroit, Gershwin A. Drain attended Detroit St. Gregory High School, a Catholic high school, where he was president of his senior class. He received his Bachelor of Science in 1970 from Western Michigan University, which he attended on a football scholarship and for which he played football as a running back for the Western Michigan Broncos from 1968 to 1969. He received his Juris Doctor in 1972 from the University of Michigan Law School. In 1991, he received a Masters of Judicial Studies degree from the University of Nevada-Reno.

== Career ==
Drain served as a law clerk for the Third Circuit Court of Michigan from 1972 to 1973. He worked as counsel for the Detroit Department of Transportation from 1973 to 1974. He then worked as an attorney in the Federal Defender Office for the Eastern District of Michigan from 1974 to 1986. He represented defendants charged with criminal felonies in federal court, and tried approximately 144 cases.

=== State judicial service ===
Drain served as a judge of the 36th District Court for Detroit from 1986 to 1987. He served as a judge on the Recorder's Court for Detroit, a state criminal court, exclusively handling felony prosecution criminal cases from 1987 to 1997, at which time said court was merged with the Third Circuit Court. He served as a judge on the Third Circuit Court of Michigan from 1997 to 2012, working in both the civil and criminal divisions of the court. By 2011, he had presided over approximately 600 cases that had gone to verdict or judgment. Of those, approximately 55 percent were jury trials, and 70 percent were criminal proceedings.

=== Federal judicial service ===
On November 17, 2011, President Barack Obama nominated Drain for District Judge for the United States District Court for the Eastern District of Michigan. Obama remarked: "Judge Gershwin A. Drain will bring an unwavering commitment to fairness and judicial integrity to the federal bench. His impressive legal career is a testament to the kind of thoughtful and diligent judge he will be on the U.S. District Court." He replaced Judge Bernard A. Friedman, who assumed senior status in 2009. He was rated Unanimously Qualified by the American Bar Association.

Regarding his views on the death penalty and gun control, Drain said:

The Republicans called me 'controversial' because of an anti-death penalty article I had written. I told them that I have to follow the law and apply it. I also wrote an article called 'I Have a Dream of Non-violence' in which I said critical things about the NRA. That became an issue, too. Those who hadn't said or written anything tended to go through smoothly.

On August 2, 2012, the United States Senate confirmed Drain by a 55–41 vote. He received his judicial commission on August 8, 2012. He assumed senior status on August 13, 2022.

=== Notable cases ===
In November 2014, he presided over the immigration fraud trial of Rasmea Odeh, and told the jury that he thought its guilty verdict was "a fair and reasonable one based on the evidence that came in." On February 13, 2015, he denied Odeh's appeal, ruling that her argument lacked legal merit. The judge held that evidence showed that Odeh illegally obtained U.S. citizenship by failing to disclose her conviction for fatal terrorist bombings, that the jurors "clearly did not believe [her] explanation", and that "the evidence was more than sufficient to support the jury's verdict." Judge Drain sentenced Odeh to 18 months in federal prison on March 12, 2015, stripping her of her citizenship of the United States, and ordering her deportation at the end of her sentence.

On February 25, 2016, Odeh won her appeal to the United States Court of Appeals for the Sixth Circuit. Circuit Judge John M. Rogers, joined partially by Judge Karen Nelson Moore, vacated and remanded, while Judge Alice M. Batchelder partially dissented, wanting to vacate while ordering a new trial. On December 6, 2016, Judge Drain denied prosecutors' request to reinstate Odeh's conviction, instead granting Odeh a new trial, scheduled to begin January 10, 2017.

On July 21, 2016, Drain struck down Michigan's ban on straight-ticket voting. He wrote that the ban would result in longer lines at polling places and would disproportionately harm black voters.

== Awards and associations ==
Drain is a member of the Michigan Bar Association, the Association of Black Judges of Michigan, a Prison Ministry for the Mound Correctional Facility, and is a lifetime member of the NAACP since 1989. He was named "Michiganian of the Year" by the Detroit News in 1997.

== Personal life ==
Drain and his wife, Meredith, have two daughters, both of whom are lawyers.

== See also ==
- List of African-American federal judges
- List of African-American jurists

Legal offices
Preceded by Bernard A. Friedman	Judge of the United States District Court for the Eastern District of Michigan; 2012–2022	Succeeded by Brandy R. McMillion
