= The Hundred Years' War on Palestine =

2020 book by Rashid Khalidi

The Hundred Years' War on Palestine: A History of Settler Colonialism and Resistance, 1917–2017
- First edition
- Author: Rashid Khalidi
- Language: English
- Subject: 20th–21st century history of Palestine
- Genre: History
- Published: 2020
- Publisher: Metropolitan Books
- Pages: 336
- ISBN: 978-1-627-79855-6
- OCLC: 1150009229

The Hundred Years' War on Palestine: A History of Settler Colonialism and Resistance, 1917–2017 is a 2020 book by Palestinian-American historian Rashid Khalidi, in which he describes the Zionist claim to Palestine in the century spanning 1917–2017 as a case of late settler colonialism and an instrument of British and later American imperialism, focusing on a series of six major episodes he characterizes as "declarations of war" on the Palestinian people.

In the book, Khalidi argues that the struggle in Palestine should be understood not as one between two equal national movements fighting over the same land but rather as "a colonial war waged against the indigenous population, by a variety of parties, to force them to relinquish their homeland to another people against their will." Khalidi characterizes the war on Palestine as waged not only by the Zionist movement and Israel, but also by the great imperial powers that backed them.

The book is oriented toward an American mainstream audience and addresses the higher-level political struggle over Palestine in the 20th century at the center of the imbalance of power between Palestinians and Israelis. In addition to the more traditional sources and methods employed by a historian, Khalidi draws on family archives, stories passed down through his family from generation to generation, and his own experiences, as an activist in various circles and as someone involved in negotiations among Palestinian groups and with Israelis.

== Background ==
Khalidi has said that this book was a departure from the previous seven books he had published, which he described as more traditional works of academic history, in that it is intended to be more accessible, to be read without referring to the pages of footnotes, and in that he inserts himself into the narrative. He noted that his son, Ismail Khalidi, and one of his cousins urged him to write a book not for academics but for a general audience, and encouraged him to incorporate his personal experiences and family archives.

== Synopsis ==
=== Introduction ===
The book begins with an examination of correspondence from 1889 between Yusuf Diya ad-Din Pasha al-Khalidi, mayor of Jerusalem and relative of the author, and Theodor Herzl, father of modern political Zionism. In his response, Herzl ignores the main concerns the Pasha raises and in reference to the non-Jewish population of Palestine, Herzl quips: "But who would think of sending them away?" Khalidi sees this early exchange as revelatory that Zionism was an essentially colonial project from its inception, that the Palestinians were never taken seriously, and that only rarely were their opinions consulted in matters that would determine their future.

=== "The First Declaration of War, 1917–1939" ===
The first chapter of the book deals with the November 1917 Balfour Declaration, announcing the British Empire's support for the "establishment in Palestine of a national home for the Jewish people", and the Mandate for Palestine granted by the League of Nations to Britain in 1922, which established Mandatory Palestine in the aftermath of the dissolution of the Ottoman Empire. Neither document refers to "Arabs", "Palestinians", or their national rights. The Jewish Agency for Palestine, acting as an almost governmental administration over the next 26 years, was an officially recognized representative of the Jewish minority in Palestine, and there was no comparable institution for the Arab majority.

=== "The Second Declaration of War, 1947–1948" ===
The second chapter has the United States replacing Britain in 1947 as the imperial power, with its moves to gather international support to ensure the passage of the UN partition resolution, which approved the establishment of a Jewish state on 56% of Arab-majority land, thereby violating the Palestinians' right to "national self-determination" as guaranteed in the UN Charter. It was followed by civil war in Mandatory Palestine, the Establishment of the State of Israel, the First Arab-Israeli War, and the Nakba, in which about 700,000 Palestinians fled or were expelled to neighboring Arab states. The Israeli government expropriated land that had been owned and abandoned by fleeing and ousted Palestinians to be used solely for the benefit of Jews, adding it to extant Jewish settlements or placing it under the control of the Israel Lands Authority and Jewish National Fund.

=== "The Third Declaration of War, 1967" ===
The third chapter highlights the colonial role of the United States in the Lyndon B. Johnson administration's approval of Israel's preemptive strikes on Egypt, Jordan, and Syria in the Six-Day War, as well as in its support for United Nations Security Council Resolution 242, which legitimated the conquest of East Jerusalem, West Bank, Gaza Strip, Sinai Peninsula, and Golan Heights and made no mention of Palestine, Palestinians, or their rights.

=== "The Fourth Declaration of War, 1982" ===
The fourth chapter also points to U.S. compliance in Israeli aggression, with its support for the 1982 Israeli invasion of Lebanon under Menachem Begin to obliterate the Palestine Liberation Organization (PLO) and Palestinian nationalism. Khalidi regards this as a joint Israeli-US operation, as the US supplied Israel with weapons and supported the expulsion of the PLO's leadership and combatants from Beirut to Tunis.

This chapter is the most personal, as Khalidi lived in Beirut for 15 years with his family. It also presents damning evidence, based on documents leaked from the Israel State Archives in 2012 as well as secret appendices from the Kahan Commission that were not in the original 1983 report, of the Israeli government's conscious decision to send Christian militias into the Sabra and Shatila refugee camps with the clear intention to instigate a massacre.

=== "The Fifth Declaration of War, 1987–1995" ===
The fifth chapter addresses the Israeli backlash against the First Intifada, the expansion of Israeli settlements in the occupied West Bank and Gaza, and the Oslo Accords—which did not resolve any fundamental Palestinian demands, such as national sovereignty, an end to occupation and colonization, the right of return for refugees, an agreement on Jerusalem, delineated borders, and land and water rights, and which were arranged based on close political, diplomatic, and military ties between Israel and the US, and were therefore tantamount to "another internationally sanctioned American-Israeli declaration of war on the Palestinians in furtherance of the Zionist movement's century-old project."

=== "The Sixth Declaration of War, 2000–2014" ===
The sixth chapter covers four chapters of Israeli violence against Palestinians in the West Bank and Gaza: backlash against the Second Intifada and the Israeli military's three attacks on Gaza in 2008, 2012, and 2014. Khalidi notes that the massive death toll and physical destruction of buildings and infrastructure were caused by lethal weapons the US supplied to Israel, including armed drones, Apache helicopters, F-15 and F-16 war planes, and 155mm howitzer artillery guns.

== Reception ==
=== Academic reception ===
In Foreign Affairs, Khalidi's colleague, political scientist Lisa Anderson, wrote that the book presented "the most cogent, comprehensive, and compelling account yet of this struggle from the Palestinian vantage point."

Israeli historian Benny Morris called the book "simply poor history". He criticized it for what he argued is an oversimplification of the conflict (including minimizing the role of Palestinian political violence), distortion of the role played by Western powers, and portrayal of Zionism as a "colonialist enterprise" as opposed to a national movement itself.

In the Journal of Palestine Studies, Laila Parsons wrote: "The bulk of the narrative is a well-written and deeply learned account of Zionist aggression and Palestinian resistance. Knowledgeable readers will not find much new information in this basic historical narrative, but two innovations stand out. The first is the way that Khalidi weaves his own personal story and the story of his family and family friends into the narrative. The second is his strong critique of most Palestinian leaders, including the top leadership of the Palestinian Liberation Organization (PLO)."

=== Other opinions ===
Daniel Sokatch, CEO of the New Israel Fund, wrote, "There is no better or more important introduction to this history from the Palestinian perspective than Khalidi's book." The Guardian called it "informed and passionate".

In December 2024, the book generated media attention when U.S. President Joe Biden was photographed holding a copy while walking out of Nantucket Bookworks.

== Translations ==
The book was translated into Arabic by Amir Shaykhūnī under the title "Ḥarb al-miʼah ʻām ʻalaʹ Filisṭīn : qiṣat al-istiʻmār al-istīṭānī wa-al muqawimah 1917–2017" (حرب المئة عام على فلسطين: قصة الاستعمار الاستيطاني والمقاومة 1917–2017).

It was translated into Dutch by Annemie de Vries and published by De Bezige Bij in 2023 under the title De honderdjarige oorlog tegen Palestina : een geschiedenis van kolonialisme en verzet.

It was translated into German by Lucien Leitess and published by Unionsverlag with an epilogue in 2024 under the title Der Hundertjährige Krieg um Palästina: Eine Geschichte von Siedlerkolonialismus und Widerstand.

It was translated into Portuguese by Rogerio W. Galindo and published in Brazil by Todavia in 2024 under the title Palestina: um século de guerra e resistência (1917 - 2017).
