= Ismail Khalidi =

Palestinian writer and diplomat

- إسماعيل راغب الخالدي
- Born: November 13, 1916; Jerusalem, Ottoman Palestine
- Died: September 2, 1968 (aged 51); Beirut, Lebanon
- Education: American University of Beirut University of Michigan Columbia University
- Occupations: Writer, diplomat
- Writing career
- Notable work: Constitutional Development in Libya (1956)

Ismail Ragib Khalidi (Arabic: إسماعيل راغب الخالدي; November 13, 1916 – September 2, 1968) was a Palestinian writer and diplomat who was a senior political affairs officer for the United Nations Department of Political Affairs.

Khalidi was born in Jerusalem, then still part of the Ottoman Empire, on November 13, 1916. He was the brother of Husayin al-Khalidi, father of Rashid Khalidi and the grandfather of the American playwright, Ismail Khalidi.

Khalidi attended St. George's School, Jerusalem and the Arab College (Jerusalem) (1927–1936). In 1939, he received his B.A.in political science from the American University of Beirut. He completed his studies in the United States, receiving an M.A. from the University of Michigan in 1940, and Ph.D. from Columbia University in 1955. Rashid Khalidi notes that his father Ismail Khalidi studied under Salo Baron at Columbia.

His Ph.D. dissertation for Columbia became the book, Constitutional Development in Libya, published in 1956, with an introduction by Adriaan Pelt. He also credits Charles Issawi and J. C. Hurewitz as having contributed to the creation of the book. At the time of publication, it was the first study conducted in English on the development of the Constitution of Libya (1951).

Khalidi also served as the assistant editor, Middle East Desk, United States Office of War Information from 1942 to 1944, and the Secretary of the Institute for Arab American Affairs from 1945 to 1948. Beginning in 1949, he was an employee at the United Nations, originally joining as a radio announcer. He died on September 2, 1968, at the age of 51 in Beirut, Lebanon.

== Publications ==
- Constitution of the United Kingdom of Libya: Background and Summary. Middle East Journal, Vol. 6, No. 2 (Spring, 1952), pp. 221–228.
- Constitutional Development in Libya. Beirut: KHAYAT's College Book Collective, 1956.
