= The Iron Cage: The Story of the Palestinian Struggle for Statehood =

2006 book

- Author: Rashid Khalidi
- Language: English
- Published: 2006 (Beacon Press)
- Publisher: Beacon Press
- Publication place: United States
- Pages: 336
- ISBN: 978-0807003084

The Iron Cage: The Story of the Palestinian Struggle for Statehood is a 2006 book by Rashid Khalidi, in which the author explores the historical and political context of Palestinian efforts to achieve statehood. The book focuses on the context for current crisis in the region by focusing on the period of the British Mandate (1920–1948).

Khalidi is a Palestinian-American historian of the Middle East and the Edward Said Professor of Modern Arab Studies at Columbia University.

== Reception ==
The book has been described as providing a vital perspective on Palestinian attempts to achieve independence and statehood.

In a review of Khalidi's The Iron Cage: The Story of the Palestinian Struggle for Statehood, for Middle East Policy, Philip Wilcox praised the book calling it "Khalidi's brilliant inquiry into why Palestinians have failed to win a state of their own." He described the book as "a welcome antidote to the propaganda and mythology that still dominate American discussion of the Israeli-Palestinian conflict."

Writing in The Guardian, Ian Black said the book "brilliantly analyses the structural handicap which hobbled the Palestinians throughout 30 years of British rule". In a review for Salon, Jonathan Shainin wrote that "The Iron Cage is a patient and eloquent work, ranging over the whole of modern Palestinian history from World War I to the death of Yasser Arafat."

In Foreign Affairs, L. Carl Brown wrote that "Khalidi's book is no exercise in victimology. He is tough on the British, the Israelis, and the Americans, but he is scarcely less hard-hitting in appraising the Palestinians". He went on to praise the final chapter's "excellent critique" of the development of the PLO's positions towards Israel and the two-state solution.

New York Times columnist Clyde Haberman wrote that "he makes this [the book] more than an exercise in self-pity by refusing to let the Palestinians themselves off the hook. If they indeed live in an iron cage, well, Khalidi says, they helped mold the bars themselves," adding, "Evaluating Khalidi’s version of the past will be left to historians. This is, remember, a conflict in which each side presents itself as history’s true orphan. While some Israeli scholars would agree with Khalidi’s analysis, many more Israelis and their supporters are sure to challenge his assertion that most Arabs were forced from their homes and did not flee of their own volition when the state of Israel came into existence in 1948."

Israeli-British historian Efraim Karsh was critical of the book's political standpoint, describing it as perpetuating the "stubborn [Palestinian] adherence to the 'one-state solution' and an equally adamant rejection of the 'two-state solution'."
