= Ziad Abuzayyad =

Palestinian lawyer, journalist and politician

Ziad Ali Khalil AbuZayyad
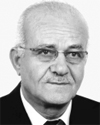

Minister of State
- In office 1998–2002
- President: Yasser Arafat
- Prime Minister: Mahmoud Abbas

Member of the Palestinian Legislative Council
- In office 1996–2006
- President: Yasser Arafat
- Prime Minister: Various

Personal details
- Born: 3 April 1940 (age 86) Bethany
- Education: Damascus University
- Occupation: Lawyer, journalist, politician

Ziad Ali Khalil AbuZayyad (Arabic: زياد علي خليل أبو زياد) (born April 3, 1940) is a Palestinian lawyer, journalist and politician.

== Biography ==
Ziad Ali Khalil AbuZayyad is an attorney at Law who graduated from Damascus University in 1965.

He is the co-editor and publisher of the quarterly Palestine-Israel Journal of Politics, Economics and Culture, PIJ.ORG, which he co-founded in 1994 with prominent Israeli journalist, Victor Cygielman, as a joint Palestinian-Israeli venture. He is also a weekly columnist of Al-Quds Arabic daily newspaper.

Abuzayyad is also a former member of the Palestinian Legislative Council (1996–2006), former Minister of State in the Palestinian Authority (1998–2002), and former Deputy Chairman of the Political Committee of the Euro-Med Parliament (2004–2005). He was also the head of the Palestinian delegation to the Middle East multilateral peace talks in the Arms Control and Regional Security Working Group (ACRS) from 1994 to 1996.

AbuZayyad was an advisor to the Palestinian negotiating team in Washington, DC in 1992, and later a member of the post-Oslo negotiating team that concluded the 1994 Israeli-Palestinian Agreement ("The Cairo Agreement" that led to the establishment of the Palestinian Authority).

He has been imprisoned several times by Israeli authorities; the last was administrative detention for six months (November 1990 to May 1991). Immediately after his release he joined the Palestinian team led by Faisal Husseini to negotiate with U.S. Secretary of State James Baker the arrangements for the Madrid Conference of 1991.

In 1986, well before the Oslo Accords, AbuZayyad founded the Palestinian bi-monthly Hebrew language journal Gesher (The Bridge), of which he was publisher and editor. He is interviewed frequently by Israeli and international media on current issues of the Israeli–Palestinian conflict, and participated in numerous regional and international conferences on the Arab–Israeli conflict, and interfaith dialog.

AbuZayyad co-authored The West Bank Political Lexicon, together with prominent Israelis, Meron Benvenisti and Danny Rubinstein, and co-edited the book Islamophobia and Anti-Semitism together with Hillel Schenker.

== Awards ==
In 2012, Ziad AbutZayyad was awarded a joint Outstanding Contribution to Peace Award with co-editor Hillel Schenker at the 8th annual International Media Awards in London.
