= Brokers of Deceit: How the U.S. Has Undermined Peace in the Middle East =

2014 book by Rashid Khalidi

- Author: Rashid Khalidi
- Language: English
- Subject: Middle East politics, U.S. foreign policy, Israeli–Palestinian conflict
- Genre: Non-fiction
- Publisher: Beacon Press
- Publication date: March 11, 2014
- Publication place: United States
- Media type: Print (Hardcover and Paperback), E-book
- Pages: 208
- ISBN: 9780807033241

Brokers of Deceit: How the U.S. Has Undermined Peace in the Middle East is a book about United States foreign policy and the Israeli–Palestinian conflict by the American-Palestinian historian and academic Rashid Khalidi. It was published in 2014 by Beacon Press. The book critically examines the role of the United States in the Israeli–Palestinian peace process.

== Summary ==
Khalidi analyses three key moments in the recent history of the conflict: the Camp David Accords in 1978, the Madrid Conference of 1991, and President Barack Obama's retreat from his initially firm stance on the settlement issue in the early years of his presidency. Throughout the book, Khalidi argues that the United States, which claims to be an impartial broker of peace, is in fact heavily biased toward Israel. He uses the term "Brokers of Deceit" to describe how American officials have used doublespeak and obfuscation to manage a rhetorical commitment to peace while actually consolidating the status quo and undermining the potential for a just resolution to the conflict.

The author also discusses the influence of domestic politics and the Israel lobby in the United States shaping U.S. policy in the Middle East. In particular, argues that American support for Israel is a product of American strategic and corporate interests, rather than solely the influence of the Israel lobby.

== See also ==
- Middle East Peace Process
- Camp David II
