= Ismail Khalidi (writer) =

American dramatist

Ismail Khalidi إسماعيل خالدي
- Born: 1982 (age 43–44); Beirut, Lebanon
- Occupations: Playwright; Poet; Actor
- Writing career
- Genre: Theater
- Notable works: Tennis in Nablus (2010); Truth Serum Blues (2005)

Ismail Khalidi (Arabic: إسماعيل خالدي; born 1982) is a Palestinian/Lebanese American playwright, screenwriter and theater director whose work tackles the history of Palestine and the modern Middle East, as well as wider themes of race, colonialism, displacement and war. He is best known for the plays Tennis in Nablus (2010) and Truth Serum Blues (2005) and a critically-acclaimed adaptation of Ghassan Kanafani's novella, Returning to Haifa, which premiered in London in 2018. Tennis in Nablus received two graduate student Kennedy Center Honors in 2008 while he was still at NYU, the Mark Twain Comedy Playwriting Award and the Quest for Peace Playwriting Award. Since then his plays have been produced and presented internationally and published in half a dozen anthologies.

== Background ==
Khalidi was born in Beirut, Lebanon in 1982 in the wake of the Israeli invasion but grew up primarily in Chicago, Illinois. He is the son of Rashid Khalidi and Mona Khalidi and the grandson of Ismail Khalidi. Khalidi received his B.A. from Macalester College in 2005 and his M.F.A. in Dramatic Writing from Tisch School of the Arts, New York University in 2009. Khalidi's MFA thesis play is titled, "Final Status."

== Career ==
His first production (co-created with Bassam Jarbawi) Truth Serum Blues, debuted in 2005 at the Pangea World Theater in Minneapolis where he was also an actor and writer in residence. His award-winning play Tennis in Nablus had its theatrical debut at the Alliance Theatre in 2010. More recently, Khalidi co-adapted Ghassan Kanafani's Returning to Haifa for the stage with fellow playwright Naomi Wallace. His longstanding professional collaboration with Wallace ranges from theatre to essays and TV projects.

Khalidi has worked as an actor, dramaturg, playwright and director in the United States, Latin America and the Middle East. He has received new play commissions from Pangea World Theater, The Public Theatre, Actors Theatre of Louisville, and Noor Theatre. He directed the Spanish adaptation of his one-person play, Foot, for Teatro Amal in 2016 at the Parque Cultural de Valparaiso and was selected in 2020-21 to be a Directing Fellow at Minneapolis' Pangea World Theater.

Khalidi has published works of poetry in Mizna: Prose, Poetry, and Art Exploring Arab America, and has written for The Nation, Remezcla, American Theatre Magazine, Guernica , The Atlanta Journal-Constitution, The Nation, Times Union (Albany), The Daily Beast, and The Electronic Intifada, The Kenyon Review and Al Jazeera.

Khalidi co-edited, along with Naomi Wallace, an anthology entitled Inside/Outside: Six Plays from Palestine and the Diaspora (Theatre Communications Group, 2015). Among the plays included in the book is Khalidi's 2010 play, Tennis in Nablus. His play about the 1982 invasion of Lebanon, Sabra Falling, was published in Double Exposure: Plays of the Jewish and Palestinian Diaspora (Playwrights Canada Press, 2016) and two monologues from his play were included, respectively, in Monologues for Actors of Color: Men; and Monologues for Actors of Color: Women, both edited by Roberta Uno and published by Routledge in 2016.

== Awards ==
=== Tennis in Nablus ===
- 2008 Kennedy Center Honors (Graduate Student Award) – Mark Twain Comedy Playwriting Award
- 2008 Kennedy Center Honors (Graduate Student Award) – Quest for Peace Playwriting Award
- National Endowment for the Arts Grant – Robert W. Woodruff Arts Center, Inc. (on behalf of Alliance Theatre)
- Two separate awards from MAP Fund (2017 and 2020)

=== General ===
- 2009–2010 New York Theatre Workshop Artist Fellows
- 2009–2010 The Alliance Theater's Kendeda Graduate Playwriting Competition

== Selected works ==
=== Playwright ===
- Truth Serum Blues (2005) (with Bassam Jarbawi)
- Tennis in Nablus (Alliance Theatre, 2010)
- Foot (Teatro Amal, 2016)
- Sabra Falling (Pangea World Theater 2017)
- Dead Are My People (Noor Theater, 2018)
- Returning to haifa (Finborough Theatre, London, 2018)
- The Corpse Washer (Actors Theatre of Louisville, 2019)
- Guernica, Gaza (with Naomi Wallace) (Ashtar Theatre, 2024)

=== Poetry ===
- Foot (2007)
- Routine Procedure(s) 2: Prayer Beads of Cold Sweat or Driving While Izlaamic (2006)
- Routine Procedure(s) (2004)
- The Wretched of the Earth, or Questions Posed the Day After Paris Takes Fire, Mizna Summer '16 Issue, Volume 17.1, 2016

=== Writing (general) ===
- "Putting Palestine on The Map...And the Soccer Jersey." Remezcla, 2015.
- "The Courage to be Dangerous." Theatre Communications Group, 2013.
- "The showdown at the U.N.." Times Union (Albany), September 23, 2011.
- "The Case for Palestine." The Daily Beast, Sep 19, 2011.
- "Remembering Juliano Mer-Khamis." The Nation, April 11, 2011 (with Jen Marlowe)
- "Debunking the Palestinian stereotype." The Atlanta Journal-Constitution, February 9, 2010.

=== Interviews and Reviews ===
- "Returning to Haifa Review - Disturbing Play is a Plea for Peace" The Guardian, March 5, 2018.
- "Ismail Khalidi's Dead Are My People Examines White Supremacy and Immigration in America, Then and Now." Muftah, October 7, 2016.
- "In Jerusalem and Jaffa with Ismail Khalidi." Words Without Borders, February 17, 2016.
  - "Review of Inside/Outside: Six Plays from Palestine and the Diaspora." Arab Stages, Volume 2, Number 1 (Fall 2015).
  - "Playwright Ismail Khalidi Talks Theater and Politics in Palestine." Muftah, November 23, 2015.
