= Emily Landau =

Israeli political scientist and international relations researcher

- אמילי לנדאו
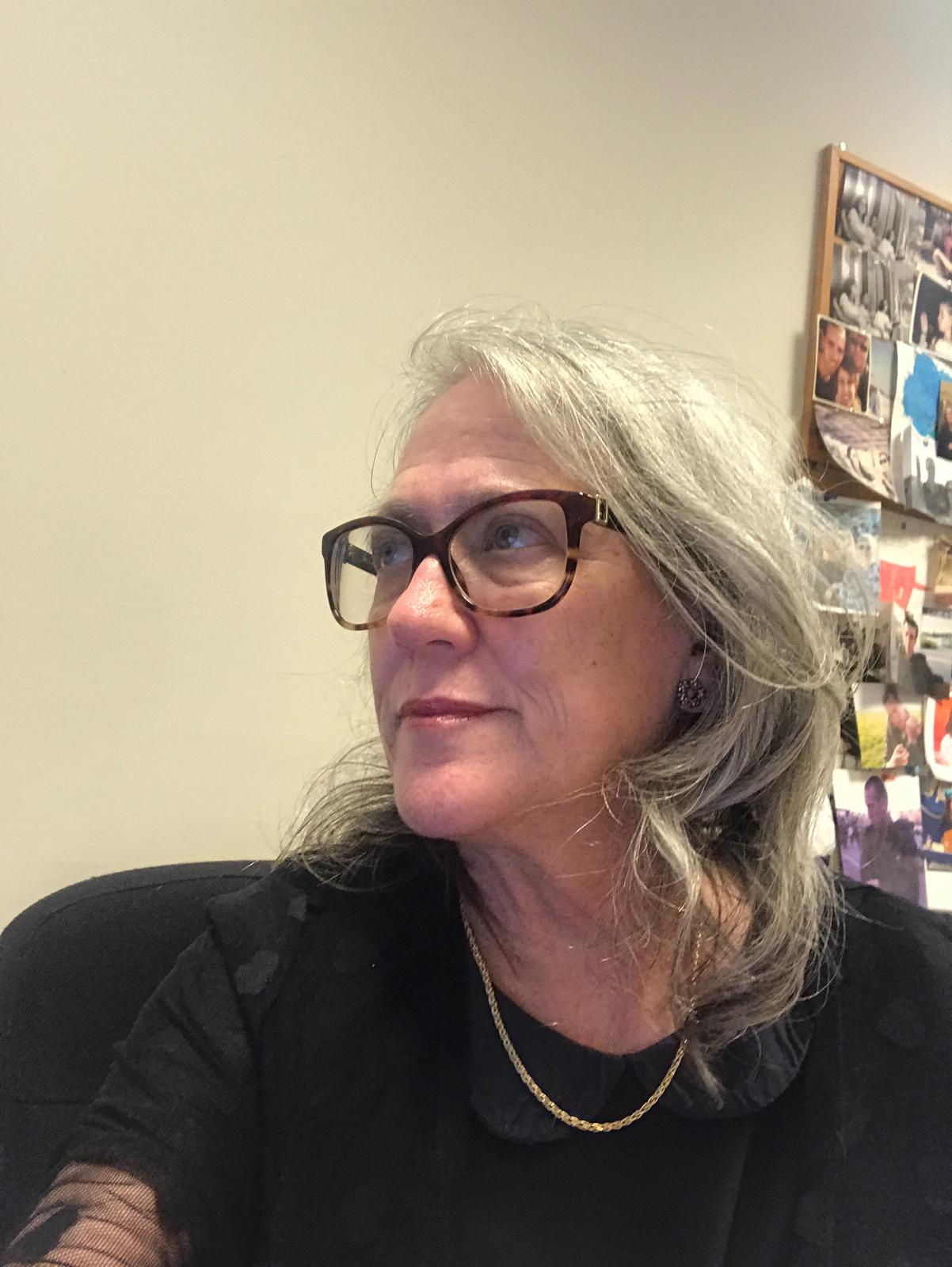
- Landau, 2019
- Born: August 1, 1960
- Died: January 6, 2020 (aged 59)
- Occupations: Researcher, scholar, lecturer
- Title: Director of the Arms Control and Regional Security Program at the Institute for National Security Studies at Tel Aviv University
- Spouse: Giora Landau
- Children: 2

Academic background
- Education: Tel Aviv University; Hebrew University of Jerusalem

Academic work
- Discipline: Political science
- Sub-discipline: International relations
- Main interests: Arms control

Emily Landau (Hebrew: אמילי לנדאו; 1 August 1960 – 6 January 2020) was an Israeli political scientist and scholar of international relations. She served as a senior research fellow at the Institute for National Security Studies (INSS) at Tel Aviv University since 1986, where she headed the Arms Control and Regional Security Program. Landau's research focused primarily on nuclear proliferation, arms control doctrines, and regional security in the Middle East.

Landau lectured at Tel Aviv University, the University of Haifa, and Interdisciplinary Center Herzliya. In 2015, she was recognized by Forbes Israel as one of the country's 50 most influential women.

== Biography ==
Landau was born in Boston, Massachusetts on 1 August 1960 as the third child of Barbara and Professor Mark Beran, a founder of the Tel Aviv University Faculty of Engineering. She immigrated to Israel with her family when she was 14.

Landau earned her bachelor's degree in political science and English, followed by a master's degree in political science, from Tel Aviv University. She subsequently received her doctorate in international relations from the Hebrew University of Jerusalem.

Landau began her career in 1986 as a research assistant at Tel Aviv University's Jaffee Center for Strategic Studies (later the Institute for National Security Studies). She advanced within the organization to become a senior research fellow and was later appointed Director of the Arms Control and Regional Security Program.

Landau authored several scholarly works on arms control and nuclear policy in the Middle East. Her first book, Israel's Nuclear Image: Arab Perceptions of Israel's Nuclear Posture (1994, Jaffee Center for Strategic Studies), examined regional perceptions of Israel's nuclear strategy.

Her second book, Arms Control in the Middle East: Cooperative Security Dialogue and Regional Constraints (2006, Sussex Academic Press), based on her doctoral thesis, analyzed the challenges and prospects of advancing regional arms control. In 2012, she published Decade of Diplomacy: Negotiations with Iran and North Korea and the Future of Nuclear Non-Proliferation through the INSS, which reviewed key diplomatic efforts concerning nuclear non-proliferation.

She also served as the editor for the INSS publication Arms Control and National Security in April 2014.

Landau was a critic of the Joint Comprehensive Plan of Action (JCPOA) signed between Iran and the P5+1 nations, arguing against it in op-ed articles and publications. She characterized Iran's actions as manipulative, drawing a comparison to North Korea's conduct regarding the 1994 Agreed Framework. She also criticized President Donald Trump's decision to withdraw the United States from the deal, arguing that he should have instead worked with other signatories to fix the deficiencies of the JCPOA.

== Academic career ==
She participated in numerous Track II nongovernmental initiatives regarding arms control and regional security in the Middle East, serving for eight years on the steering committee of the Euro-Mediterranean Study Commission (EuroMeSCo).

In addition to holding membership at INSS, she served on the editorial advisory board of Fathom. She organized international arms control conferences at the INSS and lectured at professional forums in Israel and abroad, including events hosted by Wilton Park, the Belfer Center at Harvard University, and AIPAC.

== Legacy ==
The INSS commemorates her work through the annual Emily B. Landau Prize, awarded for research in arms control and the proliferation of weapons of mass destruction.

In April 2020, her colleague, Eytan Gilboa has published a eulogy for her on the Israel Journal of Foreign Affairs. Gilboa points out two articles that he thinks illustrate best her research interests and reprent the quality of her work — Egypt, Israel, and the WMDFZ Conference for the Middle East: Setting the Record Straight of 2013 and Iran in North Korea's Footsteps: Can Anything Be Done? of 2017. He has praised her insights and observations as a scholar, and described her as a "team player", "uncompromising" and "committed to the security and wellbeing of Israel and the liberal democratic West".

== Personal life ==
Landau was married to Giora, an intellectual property lawyer. The couple had two children, Guy and Tamar.

== Publications ==
=== Books ===
- Kurz, Anat; Landau, Emily (2014). Written at Tel Aviv. Arms Control and National Security: New Horizons. Memorandum. Vol. 135. Institute for National Security Studies: Tel Aviv University. ISBN 978-965-7425-61-9.
- Landau, Emily (2012). Rosen, Judith (ed.). Decade of Diplomacy: Negotiations with Iran and North Korea and the Future of Nuclear Non-Proliferation (PDF). Memorandum No. 115. Tel Aviv: Institute for National Security Studies. ISBN 978-965-7425-33-6.
- Landau, Emily B. (2006). Arms control in the Middle East: cooperative security dialogue and regional constraints. Brighton Portland: Sussex Academic Press. ISBN 978-1-83624-049-5.
- Landau, Emily; Levité, Ariel (1994). בעיני הערבים: דימויה הגרעיני של ישראל Be'einei Ha-Aravim: Dimuya Ha-Gar'ini Shel Yisrael [Israel's Nuclear Image: Arab Perceptions of Israel's Nuclear Posture] (in Hebrew). Tel Aviv: Jaffee Center for Strategic Studies.

=== Articles ===
- Landau, Emily (2018-05-02). "Opinion | Netanyahu's Speech Proves What We Knew All Along — And That Changes Everything". The Forward.
- Landau, Emily (2018-02-13). "Opinion | Did Saturday's Clash Prove Iran Deal Skeptics Right". The Forward.
- Landau, Emily (2017-10-16). "US Policy on Iran Unveiled: Getting Tough without Leaving the Nuclear Deal". Institute for National Security Studies.
- Landau, Emily (June 2016). Written at Tel Aviv. "From Nuclear Disarmament to "Strategic Stability": Implications for Israel of an Emerging Global Debate" (PDF). Memorandum (155). Institute for National Security Studies: Tel Aviv University: 115–126.
- Landau, Emily (2014-11-25). "Use P5+1 leverage to get a good deal". European Leadership Network.
- Landau, Emily (August 2014). "US, Iran don't need to cooperate in Iraq - AL-Monitor: The Middle Eastʼs leading independent news source since 2012". Al-Monitor.
- Landau, Emily (2014-05-01). "In the zone? Chemical weapons and the Middle East: The Israeli response". Bulletin of the Atomic Scientists. 70 (3): 4–6. doi:10.1177/0096340214531184. ISSN 0096-3402.
- Landau, Emily (May 2013). "Israel, Region Need Middle East Security Forum – AL-Monitor: The Middle Eastʼs leading independent news source since 2012". Al-Monitor.
- Landau, Emily B. (2013-11-06). "Is the U.S. determined enough to confront Iran?". Haaretz. Archived from the original on 2024-06-22.
- Landau, Emily B. (2014-03-16). "How Iran is winning the war of words". Haaretz. Archived from the original on 2022-11-29.
