= Buthina Canaan Khoury =

Palestinian filmmaker

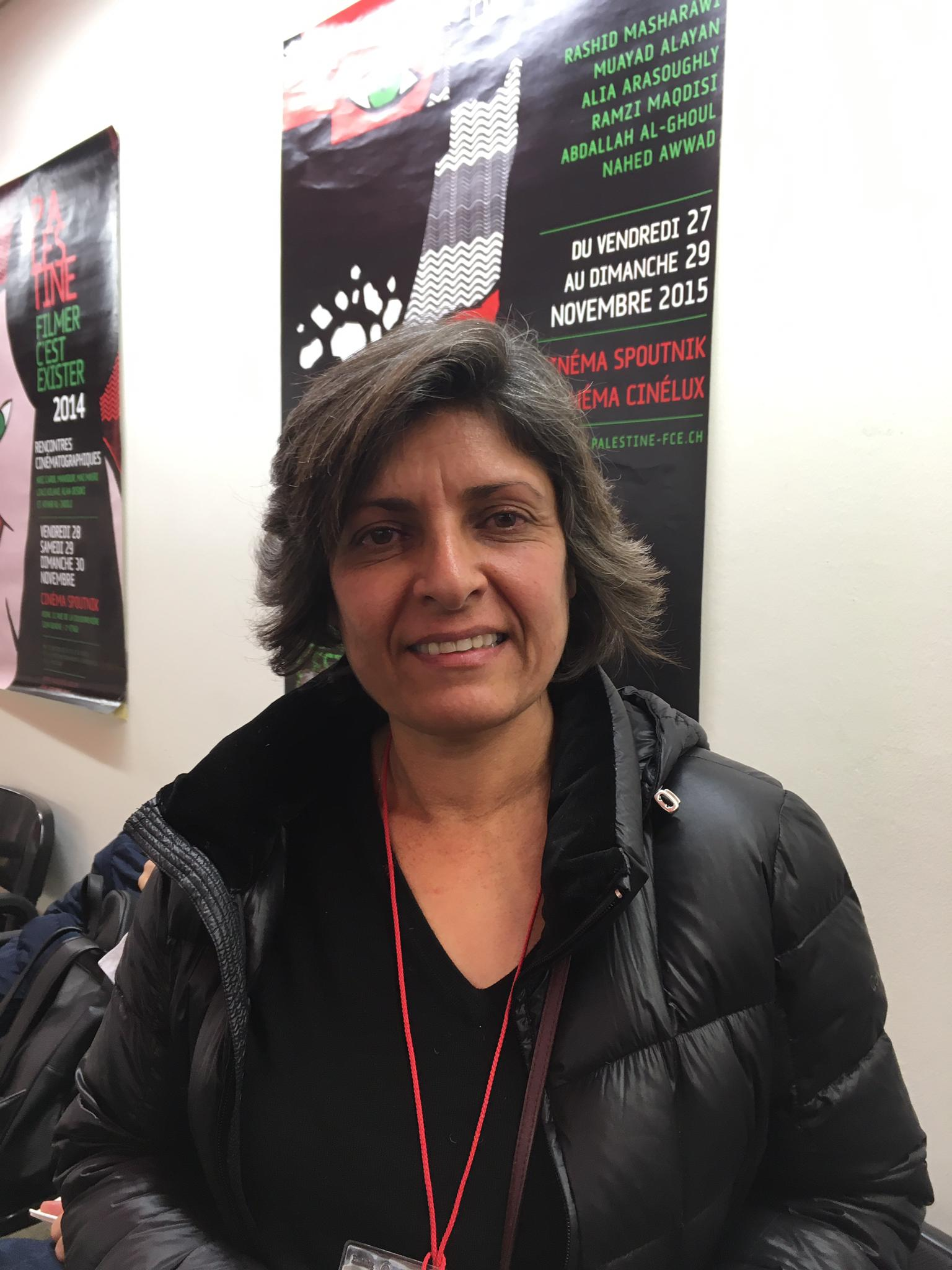
Buthina Canaan Khoury

Buthina Khoury is a Palestinian filmmaker who established Majd Production Company in Ramallah in 2000. The company's main objective is to produce documentaries about various crucial Palestinian issues, focusing on women's social and political problems. She has produced the following films: Women in Struggle (2004), Maria's Grotto (2007) and Taste the Revolution (2008).

== Education and career ==
She received her bachelor's degree in film making and photography from the Massachusetts College of Fine Arts. Khoury worked as a camera woman, producer and coordinator covering special events in the Middle East for European TV stations in Palestine.

== Awards ==
Khoury won the Silver Muhr Award at the Dubai International Film Festival in 2007.
