= Hillel Schenker =

Hillel Schenker (Hebrew: הלל שנקר) is co-editor of the Palestine-Israel Journal, a Jerusalem-based independent English language quarterly founded and run by a group of Palestinian and Israeli academics and journalists.

== Career ==
He was an editor of New Outlook, the Israeli peace monthly founded by Simha Flapan in the spirit of Martin Buber's philosophy of dialogue, and has written for The Guardian, The Nation, Los Angeles Times, L.A. Weekly, Tikkun, Israel Horizons, In These Times,The Times of Israel and the Israeli Hebrew language press. Schenker is a co-founder of the Peace Now movement, served for many years as spokesperson for the Israeli branch of International Physicians for the Prevention of Nuclear War and is an International Advisory Board member of the Global Majority Center for Nonviolent Conflict Resolution. He served as Vice Chair (2008-2012) and Chair (2012-2016) of Democrats Abroad - Israel, and is a member of the Policy Working Group, 25 Israeli former diplomats, academics, civil society activists and media people who promote support for a two-state solution in the international arena.

Schenker was the editor of "After Lebanon: The Israeli-Palestinian Connection" (The Pilgrim Press, 1983), and co-editor with Ziad Abu-Zayyad of "Islamophobia and Anti-Semitism" (Markus Wiener Publishers, Princeton, 2006). He translated "My War Diary" by Dov Yermiya (Pluto Press, London,1983 and South End Press, Boston, 1984) and "Under the Domim Tree" by Gila Almagor (Simon & Schuster, NY, 1995) from Hebrew to English.

== Awards ==
In 2012, Schenker was jointly awarded the Outstanding Contribution to Peace Award, alongside his co-editor and founder of the Palestine-Israel Journal Ziad Abuzayyad at the eighth International Media Awards held on 5 May. In May 2024, Schenker was jointly awarded the "Ari Rath Prize for Critical Journalism" alongside Co-Editor Ziad AbuZayyad by the Bruno Kreisky Forum for International Dialogue" in Vienna.
