= Mona Khalidi =

American academic

Mona Khalidi (Arabic: منى خالدي) is an American academic who was the former Assistant Dean of Student Affairs and the Assistant Director of Graduate Studies of the School of International and Public Affairs at Columbia University.

In the late 1970s and early 1980s Khalidi "worked at Wafa, the official news agency of the" Palestine Liberation Organization in Beirut, as chief editor of its English section.

Khalidi was the founding board president of the Arab American Action Network, a nonprofit organization operating in Chicago to provide social services to the local Arab American community and advocating for Arab issues and women's issues.

Khalidi married Columbia University historian Rashid Khalidi in 1972.
