= Young Artists Forum =

Palestinian art organization

Young Artists Forum منتدى الفنانين الصغار
- Founded: 2002
- Type: Non-profit
- Location: Ramallah (Palestine)
- Region served: Palestinian Territories
- Key people: Sameh Abboushi (Chairman); Mohamed S. Khalil (General Manager); Raed Badwan (Treasurer)
- Website: http://www.yaf.org.ps/

The Young Artists Forum (YAF) is a Palestinian non-governmental organization. It was officially established on December 23, 2002, and is located in Ramallah, Palestine. YAF is registered with three Palestinian Ministries: the Ministry of the Interior, the Ministry of Culture, and the Ministry of Education and Higher Education. The YAF has a Fine Art evening school for the talented of all ages, and its curriculum is certified by the Ministry of Education and Higher Education.

The YAF supports few main activities: - The evening school for teaching visual arts to all age groups. - Implementing rehabilitation projects through art that target children and youth who were a subject of, or had witnessed a Traumatic Experience in marginalized villages. - Provide courses and workshops for artists interested in Illustrating Children's Books. - Provide training courses and workshops for teachers of art education in schools.
