= 1969 Jerusalem bombings =

Supermarket bombing by the Popular Front for the Liberation of Palestine

1969 PFLP bombings in Jerusalem
- Native name: הפיגוע בסניף שופרסל בירושלים
- Location: Jerusalem
- Date: 21 February 1969; 57 years ago
- Weapon: Explosive device
- Deaths: 2 civilians
- Injuries: 9 civilians
- Perpetrator: PFLP
- No. of participants: 5

On February 21, 1969, the Popular Front for the Liberation of Palestine (PFLP) carried out a bombing attack on a supermarket in Jerusalem, killing 21-year-old Leon Kanner of Netanya and 22-year-old Eddie Joffe, students at the Hebrew University, and injuring 9.

== Supermarket bombing ==
The deaths and injuries were caused by a bomb placed in a crowded Jerusalem SuperSol supermarket which the two students stopped in at to buy groceries for a field trip. The same bomb wounded 9 others. A second bomb was found at the supermarket, and defused.

In the investigation that followed the bombings, authorities uncovered an arsenal of PFLP weaponry including explosives.

== Bombing of British Consulate ==
On 25 February 1969 the same PFLP terrorists planted two bombs in a window of the British Consulate in Jerusalem. The bomb exploded in the apartment of a secretary at the consulate, who was not home at the time. There were no injuries, although the room was wrecked. A bombing attempt at the Consulate the previous Friday failed when the bomb was discovered and detonated.

=== Rasmea Odeh ===
These two attacks are often cited in connection with Rasmea Odeh, a PFLP activist who confessed to involvement and attained later a degree of notability after she was released from an Israeli prison in a prisoner exchange and violated American immigration laws. In 1980, Odeh was among 78 prisoners released by Israel in an exchange with the PFLP for one Israeli soldier captured in Lebanon.
