= Danny Rubinstein =

Israeli journalist (1937–2026)

- דני רובינשטין
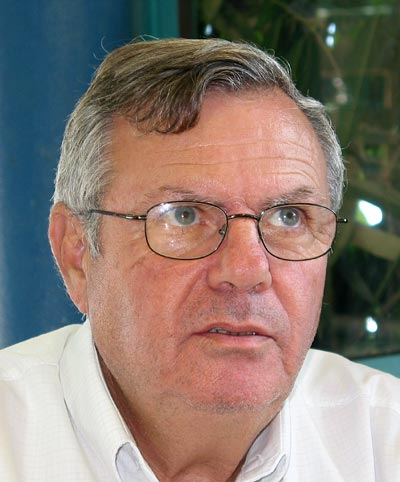
- Born: 23 December 1937; Jerusalem, Mandatory Palestine
- Died: 16 November 2026 (aged 88)
- Writing career
- Genre: Journalism
- Subject: Middle Eastern studies
- Notable work: People of Nowhere

Daniel Rubinstein (Hebrew: דניאל רובינשטין; 23 December 1937 – 16 November 2026) was an Israeli journalist and author. He worked for Haaretz, where he was an Arab affairs analyst and a member of the editorial board.

== Background ==
Rubinstein was born in Jerusalem, on 23 December 1937. He grew up in Neveh Bezalel, a small neighborhood between Nahlaot and the city center. He majored in Middle Eastern studies and sociology at the Hebrew University of Jerusalem.

In 1967, during the Six-Day War, Rubinstein was a reserve soldier in a Jerusalem reconnaissance unit led by Yossi Langotsky. This unit was the first to cross the cease-fire line into the Jordanian-controlled West Bank.

He lived in Jerusalem's Beit Hakerem neighborhood. Rubinstein died on 16 November 2026, at the age of 88.

== Journalism career ==
From 1967 to 1990, Rubinstein worked as a columnist and Jerusalem bureau chief for the now-defunct newspaper Davar. From 1990 to 2008, he worked for Haaretz, where he was a member of the editorial board. He wrote regular columns on the Arab–Israeli conflict and Palestinian affairs. He wrote a weekly column on the Palestinian economy for Calcalist, an Israeli business daily published by Yediot Ahronoth.

Rubinstein taught at the Department of Middle East history at Ben-Gurion University in Beersheba and has published several books.

In 2007, Rubinstein described Israel as an "apartheid state" at the UN-sponsored International Conference of Civil Society in Support of Israeli–Palestinian Peace. In response, the Zionist Federation of Great Britain cancelled his scheduled appearance at an event sponsored by the Federation. Its chairman, Andrew Balcombe said: "Criticism of Israeli policy is acceptable. However, by using the word 'apartheid' in a UN conference held at the European Parliament, Danny Rubinstein encourages the demonization of Israel and the Jewish people." At an event sponsored by the New Israel Fund, Rubinstein was not apologetic: "People do use the word 'apartheid' in my circles. My newspaper increasingly uses that word. This is nothing new."

== Published works ==
- Camp David 2000 (2002)
- The Mystery of Arafat (1995)
- People of Nowhere (1991)
