= Tammam Salam =

Lebanese politician (born 1945)

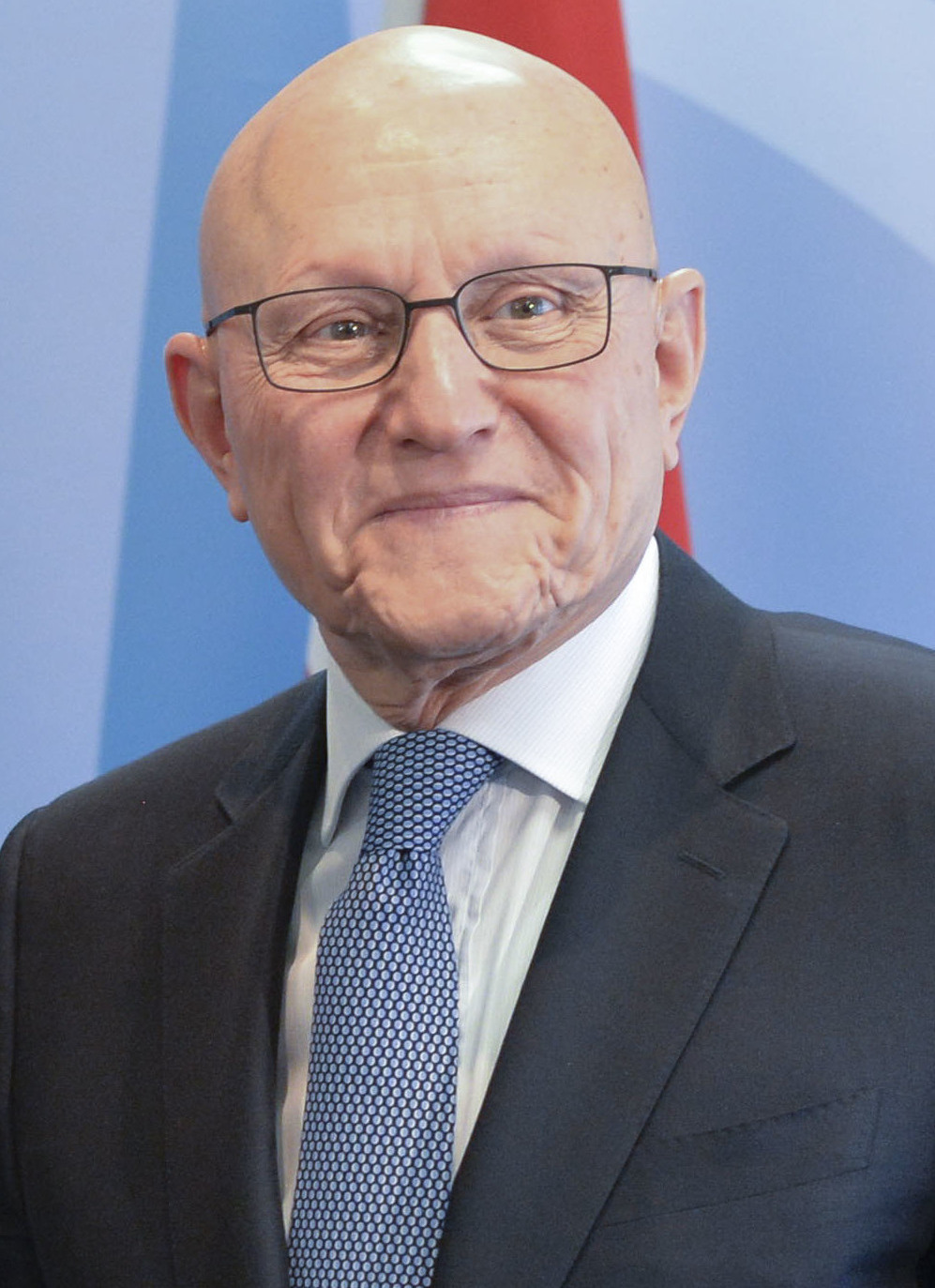
- Salam in 2016

49th Prime Minister of Lebanon
- In office 15 February 2014 – 18 December 2016
- President: Michel Suleiman; Michel Aoun
- Deputy: Samir Mouqbel
- Preceded by: Najib Mikati
- Succeeded by: Saad Hariri

Minister of Culture
- In office 11 July 2008 – 9 November 2009
- Prime Minister: Fouad Siniora
- Preceded by: Tarek Mitri
- Succeeded by: Salim Wardeh

Member of the Lebanese Parliament
- In office 20 June 2009 – 15 May 2018
- Constituency: Beirut
- In office 16 October 1996 – 17 October 2000
- Constituency: Beirut

Personal details
- Born: 13 May 1945 (age 81) Beirut, Lebanon
- Party: Independent
- Other political affiliations: March 14 Alliance (until 2016)
- Spouse: Lama Badreddine
- Children: 3
- Parent: Saeb Salam (father)
- Relatives: Salim Ali Salam (grandfather); Anbara Salam Khalidi (aunt); Nawaf Salam (cousin); Walid Khalidi (cousin); Tarif Khalidi (cousin); Usama Khalidi (cousin)
- Education: Haigazian University

Tammam Saeb Salam (Arabic: تمّام صائب سلام, romanized: Tammām Ṣāʾib Salām, pronounced [t(a)ˈmːaːm ˈsˤɑːjɪb saˈlaːm]; born 13 May 1945) is a Lebanese politician who was the Prime Minister of Lebanon from February 2014 until December 2016. He also served as the acting President of Lebanon from May 2014 until October 2016 in his capacity as prime minister. He previously served in the government of Lebanon as Minister of Culture from 2008 to 2009.

Salam was tasked with forming a new government on 6 April 2013. He was one of the independent Sunni politicians who was close to the March 14 Alliance, and also had good relations with the March 8 Alliance. Salam was appointed prime minister on 15 February 2014.

== Early life and education ==
Salam was born into a prominent and politically powerful Sunni Muslim family in Beirut on 13 May 1945. He is the eldest son of the former Lebanese Prime Minister Saeb Salam, who held the office several times since independence. His mother, Tamima Mardam Bey, was of Ottoman Turkish-Lebanese origin. His grandfather, Salim Ali Salam, was one of the Lebanese officials who served during the Ottoman era and French era. More specifically, he served as a Beirut deputy in the Ottoman parliament and was also the head of the Beirut municipality. Tammam Salam has two older sisters and two younger brothers. His cousin is Nawaf Salam, the current Prime Minister of Lebanon.

Tammam Salam is a graduate of Grand Lycée Franco-Libanais and Haigazian University in Beirut. He also holds an economics and management degree which he received in England.

== Early careers ==
Salam began his career as a businessman after graduation. He joined the political field at the beginning of the 1970s. He established the Pioneers of Reform Movement (Arabic: حركة روّاد الإصلاح) in 1973. The objective of the movement was to follow a moderate policy amid the turmoil in the country. On the other hand, the movement was also regarded as the private militia group of Salam's father, Saeb Salam. However, the movement was dissolved by Tammam Salam at the initial phase of the Lebanese civil war in order to avoid being part of the militant activities.

In 1978, he joined the Makassed foundation, a non-profit charity organization in Beirut as a board member. He became its president in 1982. The leadership of the foundation was passed through generations in the Salam family. Tammam Salam resigned as president of the Foundation in September 2000. He is currently the honorary president of the Foundation. Later, he also became the head of the Saeb Salam Foundation for culture and higher education.

== Later politics ==
In the general elections of 1992, Salam was a candidate, but later he withdrew his candidacy as a protest over the Syrian dominance in Lebanon. His boycott aimed at supporting the Lebanese Christians in an attempt to preserve the sectarian balance in the country. Salam was first elected to the parliament in the 1996 elections from Beirut as an independent candidate. However Salam lost his seat in the general elections held in 2000. He did not run for office in the 2005 general elections.

He was appointed minister of culture in the cabinet led by Prime Minister Fouad Siniora on 11 July 2008. Salam also won his seat in the general elections held in 2009. He entered an electoral alliance with Saad Hariri and became part of his list in Beirut's third district. Salam was an independent member of the Lebanese parliament. In addition, he was part of the Lebanon First bloc in the parliament, but not a member of any political party, making him a centrist figure.

On 30 September 2015 President Tammam Salam addressed the United Nations General Assembly during general debates, attended other events both within the UN and beyond, met with various world leaders.

=== Premiership ===
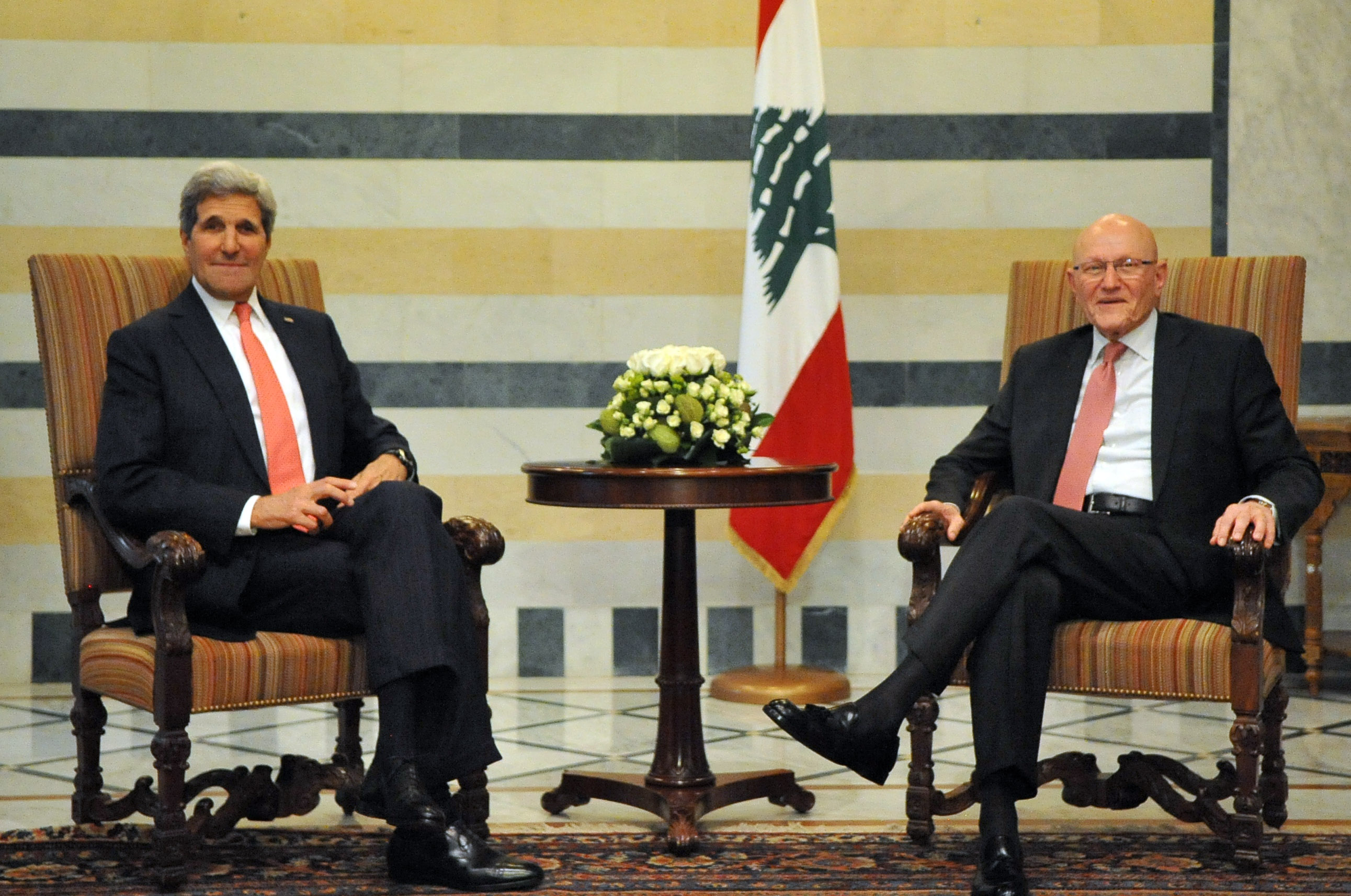
U.S. Secretary of State John Kerry meets with Tammam Salam at the Prime Minister's office in Beirut

Following the resignation of Najib Mikati as prime minister on 23 March 2013, Salam was designated as a consensus prime minister. The 14 March Alliance officially nominated Salam as prime minister. Salam was tasked with forming a government on 6 April 2013 after garnering 124 votes out of 128 parliament members. On 15 February 2014, he announced the formation of a new government of 24 ministers.

In 2014, Salam's cabinet took over the presidency, as per the constitution, since Parliament failed to elected a new one to succeed Michel Suleiman. Two years later, Michel Aoun was elected an took office, which led to his resignation and the forming of a new government.

== Views ==
Following the assassination of Rafik Hariri on 14 February 2005, Salam said "Playing with emotions is a very dangerous game in Lebanon, a game which Hariri himself never subscribed to." referring to mass demonstrations blaming Syria for the assassination in the country.

== Personal life ==
Salam is married to Lama Badreddine and has three children from a previous marriage.

Political offices
Preceded by Tarek Mitri	Minister of Culture; 2008–2009	Succeeded by Salim Wardeh
Preceded by Najib Mikati	Prime Minister of Lebanon; 2014–2016	Succeeded by Saad Hariri
