= Saeb Salam =

Prime Minister of Lebanon

- صائب سلام
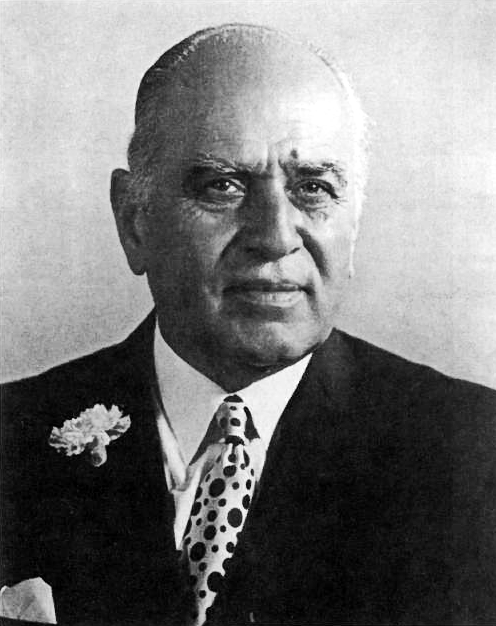
- Salam in 1952

8th Prime Minister of Lebanon
- In office 14 September 1952 – 18 September 1952
- President: Bechara Khoury
- Preceded by: Nazem Akkari
- Succeeded by: Abdallah Yafi
- In office 1 May 1953 – 16 August 1953
- President: Camille Chamoun
- Preceded by: Khaled Chehab
- Succeeded by: Abdallah Yafi
- In office 2 August 1960 – 31 October 1961
- President: Fouad Chehab
- Preceded by: Ahmed Daouk
- Succeeded by: Rachid Karami
- In office 13 October 1970 – 25 April 1973
- President: Suleiman Frangieh
- Preceded by: Rachid Karami
- Succeeded by: Amin Hafez

Personal details
- Born: 17 January 1905 Beirut, Ottoman Empire
- Died: 21 January 2000 (aged 95) Beirut, Lebanon
- Party: Independent
- Spouse: Tamima Mardam Beik
- Children: 5, including Tammam
- Parent: Salim Ali Salam (father)
- Relatives: Anbara Salam Khalidi (sister); Tammam Salam (son); Nawaf Salam (nephew); Walid Khalidi (nephew); Tarif Khalidi (nephew); Usama Khalidi (nephew)
- Religion: Sunni Islam

Saeb Salam (Arabic: صائب سلام; 17 January 1905 – 21 January 2000) was a Lebanese politician and za'im (political boss) who served as Prime Minister six times between 1952 and 1973. Following his death, the Lebanese daily As-Safir described Salam as "most successful in dealing with the media and in presenting a particular image of himself to people on a daily basis through wearing his customary carnation ... and expounding unforgettable slogans", and that he was Lebanon's most popular prime minister after independence leader Riad Al Solh. A significant aspect of Salam was that, unlike other Lebanese leaders, he did not act as a chief over a particular area in the country. Salam fiercely advocated the unity of Lebanon.

== Early life and education ==
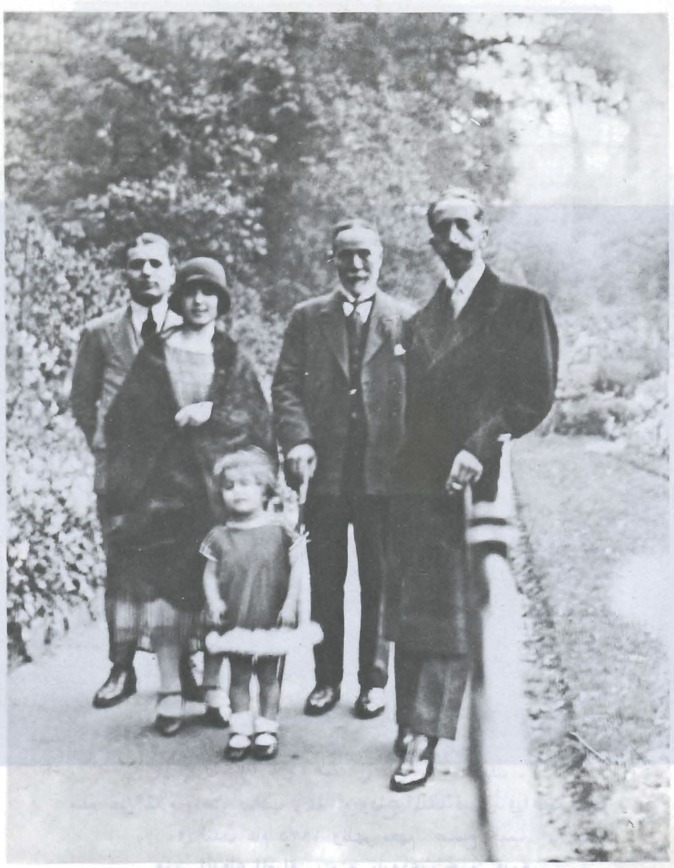
Salim Ali Salam with King Faisal I of Iraq in London along with Salim's son Saeb Salam and daughters Anbara and Rasha, 1925

Salam was the son of Salim Ali Salam, the scion of a prominent Sunni Muslim family, who was a prominent politician both under Ottoman rule and then during the French Mandate, being a member of the Ottoman parliament, and an import-export businessman. He was born on 17 January 1905. He held a bachelor's degree in economics.

His family was liberal in regard to religion and his sister, Anbara Salam Khalidy, was the first Lebanese Muslim woman, who did not wear the veil in public.

== Career ==
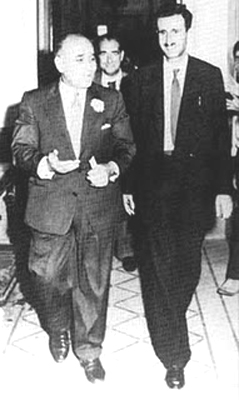
Salam (left) and ally Kamal Jumblatt (right) in the Damascus office of Syrian President Shukri al-Quwatli, 1958

The younger Salam got his first taste of politics in 1941, when he started campaigning against French and British mandates in the Levant and Palestine. He joined in this endeavour by Abdel-Hamid Karami, a legislator from Tripoli. In 1943, Salam was elected to the National Assembly from a Beirut constituency. After founding Middle East Airlines in 1945, Salam was appointed Minister of the Interior in 1946 - his first cabinet position. Six years later, he became Prime Minister for the first time, on 14 September 1952. His administration lasted only four days; under the pressure of strikes and demonstrations, President Bechara El Khoury was forced to resign. Salam's government resigned too. He was recalled on 1 May 1953 by the new president, Camille Chamoun (whose election Salam had supported); this time, his term of office lasted 106 days, until 16 August. The cabinet was formed to oversee the general elections.

Salam was appointed oil minister by prime minister Abdallah Yafi in 1956, and negotiated deals the Aramco and Tapeline companies to connect the Zahrani and Baddawi refineries with oilfields in Saudi Arabia and Iraq. President Chamoun's support for the British, French, and Israeli invasion of Egypt during the Suez Crisis, however, led both Yafi and Salam to resign in protest. He participated in demonstrations in 1958 that followed, was wounded, and was subsequently placed under arrest while recovering in hospital. He was released after a five-day hunger strike, however.

In the parliamentary election of 1957, Salam lost his seat, as did Yafi, Rashid Karami and Kamal Jumblatt. Allegations of vote rigging were never proven, but that the allegation that the constituencies were gerrymandered was little disputed. Yafi and Salam led a strike upon these events. On 25 September 1957, Salam, Yafi and Hussein Oweini, who was also former prime minister, were indicted due to their alleged involvement in organizing an armed coup and rioting.

Salam, Karami, Yafi and Jumblatt subsequently formed an opposition bloc espousing Arab nationalism and sympathetic to the policies of Gamal Abdel Nasser, the president of the newly formed United Arab Republic, a union between Egypt and Syria. The opposition's consternation at President Chamoun's reported plans to seek a second term in office and to join the pro-Western Baghdad Pact led to the outbreak of five months of civil strife in 1958 between the opposition's mostly Muslim supporters and Chamoun's mostly Christian supporters. The crisis only ended with an agreement by Chamoun not to seek another term and the election of General Fuad Chehab, who was perceived as a moderate, as president in September; Salam declared the end of the violence with what was to become his trademark slogan: "No winner, no loser." His attitude at that time made him a communal hero.

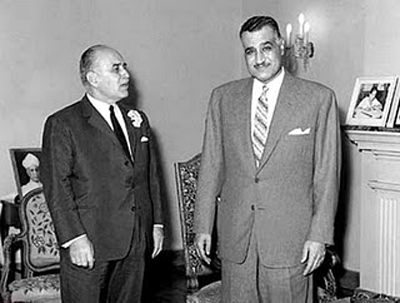
Salam with Egypt's president Gamal Abdel Nasser in Demascus, 1959

Salam became prime minister again on 2 August 1960, and remained in office until 31 October 1961. Salam held the office of defense minister three times, last time in 1961. He broke with President Chehab, however, over what he saw as the granting of undue powers to the police. During his mandate as a prime minister he participated at the 1st Summit of the Non-Aligned Movement in Belgrade, FPR Yugoslavia making Lebanon one of the founding members of the Non-Aligned Movement. Throughout the 1960s he opposed the "police state" that he accused Chehab and his chosen successor, Charles Helou, of trying to establish, and in 1968 he spoke out against political interference by military intelligence. His opposition to Chehabist rule intensified, and in 1970, he helped to assemble a parliamentary coalition that elected Suleiman Frangieh to the presidency, by one vote, over the Chehabist candidate Elias Sarkis.

Frangieh appointed Salam prime minister for the fourth time on 13 October 1970. This administration, which lasted until 25 April 1973, was his longest. He fell out with Frangieh and resigned as prime minister in the wake of an Israeli commando raid in Beirut, which killed three Palestinian leaders, in protest against Frangieh's refusal to dismiss the army commander, General Iskandar Ghanem, for negligence. Salam declared that he would not accept the post of prime minister again. During the civil war Salam's motto was "One Lebanon, not two."

Out of office, Salam remained influential. In the wake of the Israeli invasion of Lebanon in 1982, he mediated between the United States envoy, Philip Habib and the PLO chairman Yasser Arafat, securing the removal of the Palestinian military presence in Lebanon. He opposed the election to the Presidency of Bachir Gemayel, but was reconciled to him after the election and began working with him on a number of reform proposals. When Gemayel was assassinated on 14 September of that year, without having taken office, Salam supported his brother, Amine Gemayel, for the Presidency and persuaded most Muslim National Assembly members to vote for him. Salam retired from politics in 1992.

== Exile and charity activities ==
In 1985, Salam went into exile in Geneva, Switzerland, after surviving two assassination attempts. He had angered the Syrian government and hardline Muslim groups with the conciliatory stands he had taken at peace conferences held at Geneva and Lausanne the year before, and he did not feel safe to return to Lebanon until 1994. From exile, however, he played a key role in the negotiations that led to the Taif Agreement of 1989, which eventually led to the end of the civil war. A noted philanthropist, Salam headed the Makassed foundation, an educational and healthcare charity, from 1957 to 1982, when he was succeeded by his son Tammam.

== Personal life ==
In addition to Tammam, Salam had two other sons Faisal and Amr, and two daughters with his wife, Tamima Mardam Bey, whom he married in 1941. Mardam Bey was of Syrian origin and hails from Damascus.

== Death ==
Salam died of a heart attack on 21 January 2000, 4 days after his 95th birthday.

== See also ==
- 1958 Lebanon crisis
- Lebanese Civil War
- Lebanese Movement in Support of Fatah
- Mountain War (Lebanon)

Political offices
Preceded by Nazem Akkari	Prime Minister of Lebanon; 1952	Succeeded by Abdallah El-Yafi
Preceded by Khaled Chehab	Prime Minister of Lebanon; 1953	Succeeded by Abdallah El-Yafi
Preceded by Ahmed Daouk	Prime Minister of Lebanon; 1960-1961	Succeeded by Rashid Karami
Preceded by Rashid Karami	Prime Minister of Lebanon; 1970-1973	Succeeded by Amin al-Hafez
