= All That Remains =

All That Remains may refer to:

== Literature ==
- All That Remains (novel), a 1992 novel by Patricia Cornwell
- All That Remains: The Palestinian Villages Occupied and Depopulated by Israel in 1948, a book edited by Walid Khalidi

== Music ==
- All That Remains (band), an American heavy metal band
- All That Remains (album), a 2005 album by Fozzy, or the title song
- All That Remains (EP), a 2005 EP by Circle II Circle, or the title song
- "All That Remains", a song by 3 from The End Is Begun
- "All That Remains", a song by Bolt Thrower from Realm of Chaos

== Other uses ==
- All That Remains (film), a 2016 film based on the life of Takashi Nagai
- "All That Remains" (The Walking Dead), an episode of the graphic adventure The Walking Dead: Season Two
