= Wafaa Sleiman =

First Lady of Lebanon (2008-2014)

- وفاء سليمان
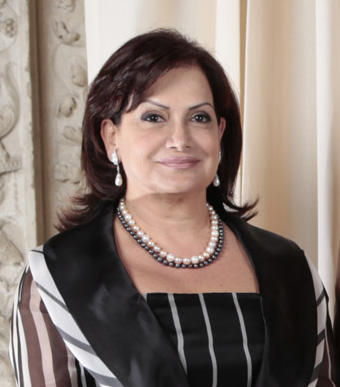

First Lady of Lebanon
- In role 25 May 2008 – 25 May 2014
- President: Michel Suleiman
- Preceded by: Andrée Lahoud
- Succeeded by: Lama Salam (Acting)

Personal details
- Born: Wafaa Sleiman; 20 June 1952 (age 74) Amsheet, Lebanon
- Spouse: Michel Suleiman (m. 1973)
- Children: 3
- Education: Lebanese University

Wafaa Sleiman (Arabic: وفاء سليمان; born 20 June 1952) is the former First Lady of Lebanon from 2008 to 2014 and the wife of President Michel Suleiman.

== Personal details ==
Wafaa Sleiman was born in Amsheet, Lebanon, on 20 June 1952. She obtained a bachelor of science degree in Teaching and Education from the Teachers Training College in 1970, then later obtained a bachelor of arts degree in philosophy from the Lebanese University in 1973. She married Michel Suleiman in the same year. They have three children: Rita (born in 1975), Lara (born in 1978) and Charbel (born in 1983).

== Honours ==
- Spain:
  - Dame Grand Cross with Collar of the Order of Isabella the Catholic

Honorary titles
Preceded by Andrée Lahoud	First Lady of Lebanon; 2008–2014	Succeeded by Lama Salam; Acting
