= Anbara Salam =

British writer

- Education: University of York; St Antony's College, Oxford
- Years active: 2017–present
- Partner: Struan Murray
- Children: 2
- Family: Anbara Salam Khalidi (great-grandmother)
- Website: www.anbarasalam.com

Anbara Salam is a British author of historical fiction. She wrote the novels Things Bright and Beautiful (2018), Belladonna (2020), and Hazardous Spirits (2023).

== Early life ==
Salam grew up in London with her younger siblings. Her Palestinian-Lebanese Muslim father and Scottish Presbyterian mother met in England in the 1980s as an international student and working-class librarian respectively. Salam's great-grandmother and namesake was Lebanese feminist Anbara Salam Khalidi. Salam attended a day school in London. She was commended as a Foyle Young Poet in 2001 and a top 15 winner in 2002. She graduated with a Bachelor of Arts (BA) in English and History from the University of York and later pursued a PhD in Theology at St Antony's College, Oxford.

== Career ==
In 2017, it was announced Fig Tree (a Penguin Books imprint) had won a three-way auction to publish Salam's debut novel Things Bright and Beautiful in April 2018. The novel, centred around a married missionary couple in the New Hebrides, was inspired by her own experience living in Vanuatu for six months. At the time, outside of writing, Salam worked for an NGO that provided refugee students with postgraduate scholarships.

Fig Tree would go on to publish Salam's second novel Belladonna: Our Italian Year, which took two years to write and edit, in 2020. Set in the 1950s, the novel follows Bridget and Isabella, a pair of American Catholic school friends from Connecticut who win scholarships to the Accademia di Belle Arti di Pentila in northern Italy. Belladonna appeared on The New Arab's list of best books by Arab authors that year.

In 2022, Salam moved to Baskerville (an imprint of Hachette UK) for a two-book deal. She had begun writing her third novel, a paranormal occult mystery set in 1920s Edinburgh, during the COVID-19 lockdown. The novel, titled Hazardous Spirits, was released in October 2023.

The Salvage is a finalist for the 2026 Lambda Literary Award for Bisexual Literature.

== Personal life ==
Salam lives in Oxford with her partner Struan Murray, also a writer, and their two children (born 2021 and 2024). She is queer and used her novel Belladonna to come out to her parents, an experience she wrote about in the essay "Unheld Conversations".

== Bibliography ==
=== Novels ===
- Things Bright and Beautiful (2018)
- Belladonna: Our Italian Year (2020)
- Hazardous Spirits (2023)
- The Salvage (2025)

=== Short stories and essays ===
- "Downtown Beirut", essay in Five Dials N. 45: Europe in Pieces (2018)
- "Circus Freak", short story in The Circus (2019) for the Berlin Writing Prize (Runner-up)
- "Unheld Conversations", essay in This Arab is Queer (2022), edited by Elias Jahshan
