= Lama Salam =

Lebanese politician

Lama Salam لمى سلام
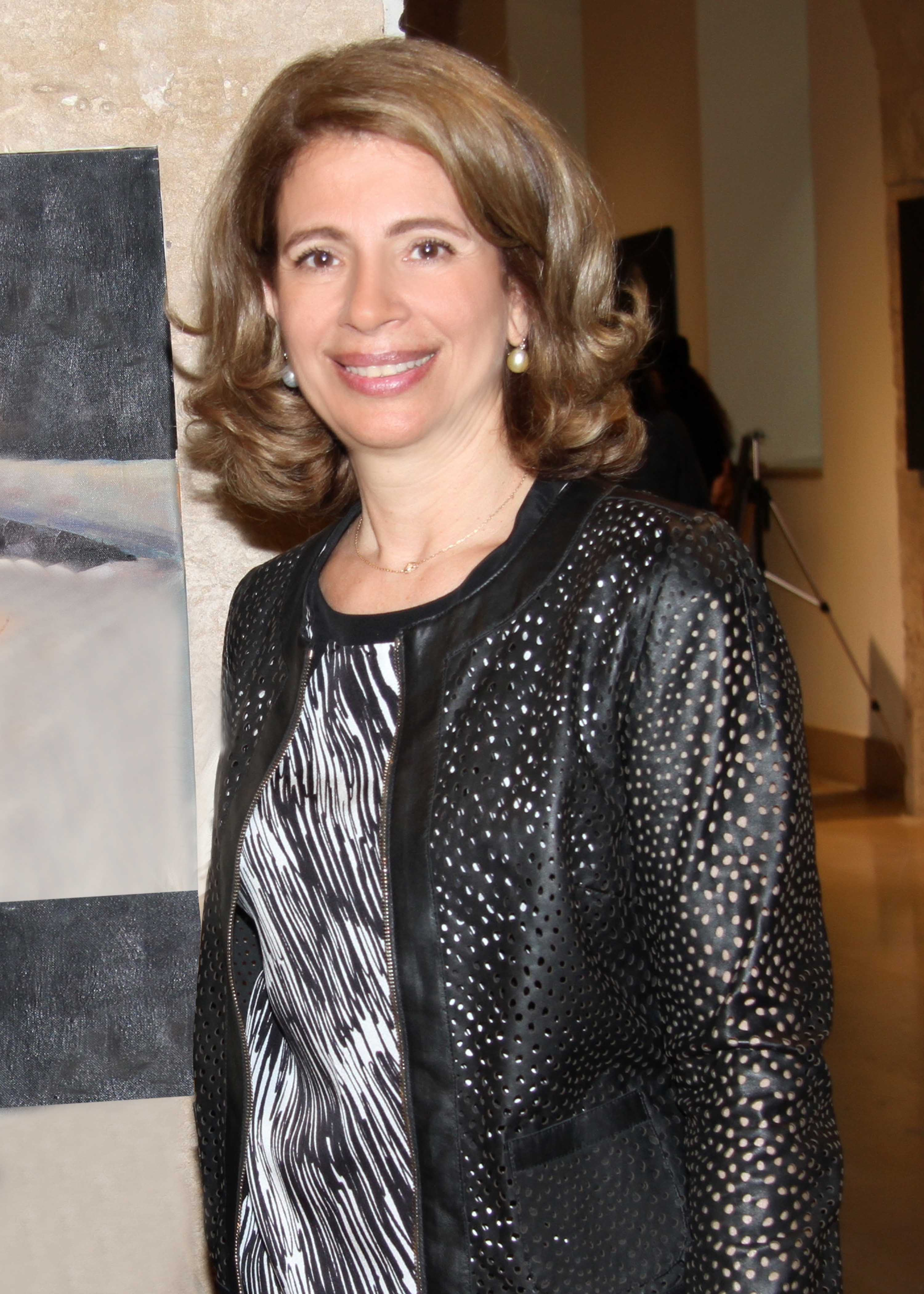

Spouse of the Prime Minister of Lebanon
- In role 15 February 2014 – 18 December 2016
- Prime Minister: Tammam Salam
- Preceded by: May Mikati
- Succeeded by: Lara Al Azem

Personal details
- Born: Lama Badreddine; 1961 (age 64–65) Beirut, Lebanon
- Spouse: Tammam Salam
- Children: Ghida Al Zein Geha; Majid Al Zein
- Education: Collège Louise Wegmann
- Alma mater: Université de Rouen

Lama Badreddine Salam (Arabic: لمى بدر الدين سلام; born 1961) is a Lebanese activist and is married to Tammam Saeb Salam, former Prime Minister of Lebanon. She is an educational counselor and activist for several non-governmental organizations (NGOs) in Lebanon.

== Early life and education ==
Daughter of Dr. Malek Badreddine and Salwa Diab, she is the eldest of her two brothers and sister. Salam graduated in 1979 from Collège Louise Wegmann, a private high school in Beirut. She holds a BA in Education Science from Université de Rouen in Rouen, France.

== Career ==
She has been a member of the board of trustees of Collège Louise Wegmann, her alma mater, since 1993. Between 1987 and 1993, she worked at Collège Louise Wegmann both as a teacher and as a French language coordinator for elementary classes. In 1991-1992 she was elected president of the association of Collège Louise Wegmann alumni.

Her dedication to contribute to the improvement of the Lebanese society led her to become a founding member of the Board of Himaya in 2009. She played a key role in raising funds for Himaya and creating awareness of the issue on numerous occasions. She has actively contributed to common projects between the two highly related NGOs Himaya and Arc en Ciel Foundation widening accordingly the efforts to fight against children abuse.

In 2011, she became a member of the Council of the National Heritage Foundation. As a member of the Council of National Heritage Foundation (NGO) for safeguarding national heritage she is responsible for La Boutique (a souvenir shop) at the Museum where all revenues generated by La Boutique are used to fund Beirut National Museum. Salam contributes to the Nocturnal evenings of the National Museum of Beirut event organized every Christmas season.

Lama Salam is also the chair of Beirut Cultural Festival Association.

== Events at the Grand Serail ==
Mrs. Salam launched the initiative "Date at the Serail" (موعد في السراي) to steer specialists and NGOs to raise important social, cultural, medical, environmental and educational topics, using the premises of the Grand Serail (office of the Prime Minister) as a national platform for significant issues related to the life of all Lebanese citizens. Salam chose to organize a kermes for orphans to launch the weekly initiative. On a weekly basis, starting in April 2014, different topics were discussed such as, women empowerment, the inclusion of special needs children in schools, the active aging of the elderly, the environment and the exhibition of young talent for Lebanese artists. Under the title Angels of Compassion, Lama Salam held an honorary ceremony for senior nurses.

=== Date at the Serail Events ===
- 12 October 2016 Lebanese Joint Coalition Against Thrombosis - LJCAT
- 18 June 2016 Prizes distribution for the winners of a school contest on smoking within the context of the Meeting at the Serail's events
- 6 April 2016 Promising Lebanese talents
- 27 May 2015 Beyond disabilities
- 19 April 2015 Volunteering as an opportunity for everyone
- 18 March 2015 Promoting women's role in the preservation of water resources in Lebanon
- 25 February 2015 Launching youth initiative to motivate students to pursue their dream of finding a job
- 23 October 2014 Sports against violence
- 17 September 2014 What's wrong with me, doc? STRESS
- 26 June 2014 Honoring cinema and theater actors, directors and writers
- 12 June 2014 Honoring Lebanese charities providing care to sick children
- 15 May 2015 My environment, my country
- 7 May 2014 How to avoid turning the elderly into impotent persons
- 3 May 2014 The angels of mercy
- 27 April 2014 The integration of children with special needs in schools
- 9 April 2014 Meeting with the orphans

She also organised a yearly Christmas Lunch Celebration for the Orphans at the Grand Serail and a yearly mothers' day lunch.

== Personal life ==
Lama Badreddine Salam is married to Tammam Saeb Salam and has two children from her first marriage.

Honorary titles
Preceded by May Mikati	Spouse of the Prime Minister of Lebanon; 2014–2016	Succeeded by Lara Al Azem
Preceded by Wafaa Sleiman	First Lady of Lebanon; Acting; 2014–2016	Succeeded by Nadia El-Chami
