= Salem Hanna Khamis =

Palestinian statistician and UN official (1919–2005)

- Born: November 22, 1919; Renineh village, Kaza of Nazareth, Ottoman Syria
- Died: June 16, 2005 (aged 85); Hemel Hempstead, United Kingdom

Academic background
- Education: Arab College in Jerusalem, American University of Beirut, University College London

Academic work
- Discipline: International Statistician
- Institutions: American University of Beirut
- Notable ideas: Geary–Khamis dollar, Sampling theory, tabulation of the Incomplete gamma function, wrote “Tables of the Incomplete Gamma Function Ratio”.

Salem Hanna Khamis (Arabic: سالم حنا خميس) (November 22, 1919 – June 16, 2005) was a Palestinian economic statistician for the United Nations Food and Agriculture Organization who helped formalise the Geary-Khamis method of computing purchasing power parity of currencies.

== Education and early career ==
Son of Hanna and Jamileh a Christian Palestinian family, Salem Khamis was born on November 22, 1919, in Reineh village, Palestine. He finished high school in 1938 with distinction at the Arab College in Jerusalem. He received a British Mandate scholarship for studying at the American University of Beirut (AUB), where he received in 1941 a BA degree in mathematics (major) and Physics (minor), and in 1942 an MA in physics.

From 1942 to 1943, Salem taught at the Akka High School in Acre and St Lucas High School in Haifa. In 1943 he was appointed a lecturer in the Mathematics Department at AUB. In 1945 he received a British Council scholarship for a PhD at University College London. He defended his thesis during the 1948 Arab-Israeli War and Palestinian exodus (Nakba), and received the PhD title in 1950. In 1948 he was refused entrance to the new State of Israel, in whose territory Reineh now lay. Instead, he moved to Aleppo, Syria, where he lectured Applied Mathematics in the Engineering College of Syria University (now University of Damascus), and was appointed head of the Mathematics department.

== United Nations ==
In 1949 he married Mary Guy and they had four children: Thea, Hanna, Christopher and Tareq. He accepted an invitation from the United Nations to work in its Statistical Office in Lake Success (1949–1950) then New York (1950–1953). In addition to his position in the United Nations, he became part-time visiting lecturer in the Mathematical Statistics Department at Columbia University. Salem finally visited his home in Israel in 1952. In 1953 he returned to AUB as associate professor of economics. Between 1955 and 1958 he was appointed Professor and Chairman of Mathematics Department. Between 1958 and 1963 he became United Nations Food and Agriculture Organization Regional Statistician for the Near East (duty stations: Cairo, United Arab Republic 1958–1960, and Rome, Italy 1960–1963).

Between 1961 and 1970 Salem became Chief of the FAO Trade Prices Branch in Rome. Between 1970 and 1972 he was Director and UN Project Manager at the Institute of Statistics and Applied Economics, Makerere University, Kampala, Uganda. In 1972 he returned to Rome to become Head of the FAO Methodology Group – Statistical Development Service until 1974, and Chief of the Service 1975–1981. In parallel (1976–1978), he acted in Baghdad as UN Project Manager/Chief Advisor to the Arab Institute for Training and Research in Statistics.

In 1981 Salem resigned from his position at FAO and moved to England where his children lived. However, he continued to work as an expert and as the head of scientific missions by the UN, and consulted at countries, such as:

- 1981-1987: Statistics Advisor, Arab Fund for Social Economic Development, Kuwait
- 1982: Evaluation and development of the statistical activities of the Palestine Liberation Organization (PLO)
- 1986: Jordan Government Consultant, Rural Research Centre, An-Najah National University, Nablus, West Bank
- Statistics Advisor for Sri Lanka, Libya, Sudan and others

Salem Khamis died on June 16, 2005, at his residence in Hemel Hempstead, England

== Scientific contributions ==
Khamis contributed scientific research papers in statistics and mathematics. Specifically, he contributed to Sampling theory and the tabulation of the Incomplete gamma function, where he wrote the book “Tables of the Incomplete Gamma Function Ratio”.

He contributed in the field of index number theory through a series of papers starting 1972. He developed what became known as, and “indelibly imprinted on all the recent work on international comparisons of prices, real incomes, output and productivity” (Rao, 2005), the Geary-Khamis Method of Computing Purchase Power Parity of Currencies and the Geary-Khamis dollar used to compare different economies.

== Sources ==
- CV by Salem Hanna Khamis
- Rao, Prasada (15 July 2005). "Salem Khamis, Statistician who formulated PPPs". The Independent Obituaries. Archived from the original on 30 September 2007.
- "The Dr Salem H Khamis Scholarship". Friends of Birzeit University.
