= Halil-Salim Jabara =

Israeli Arab politician (1913-1999)

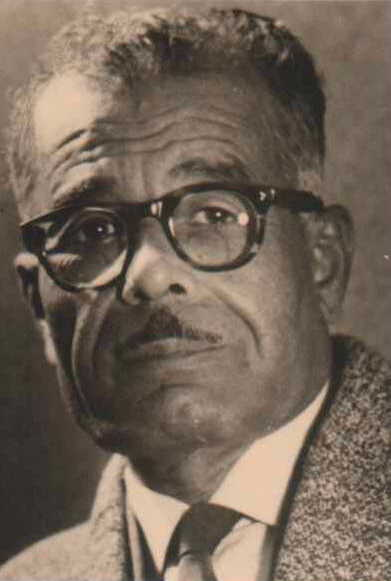
- Jabara in the mid-1960s

Faction represented in the Knesset
- 1964–1965: Ahdut HaAvoda

Personal details
- Born: 1913 Tayibe, Ottoman Empire
- Died: 1999 (aged 85–86)

Halil-Salim Jabara (Arabic: خليل سليم جبارة, Hebrew: חליל-סלים ג'בארה; 1913–1999) was an Israeli Arab politician who served as a member of the Knesset for Ahdut HaAvoda between 1964 and 1965.

== Biography ==
Born in Tayibe or Tira during the Ottoman era, Jabara studied at the Arab College in Jerusalem. Between 1932 and 1948 he worked in the Surveyors Office of the Mandate authorities. From 1951 until 1955 he was the director of the Income Tax office in the Triangle area, before serving as director and secretary of the Kupat Holim in Tayibe between 1955 and 1958.

A member of the Arab department of Ahdut HaAvoda, he was on the party's list for the 1961 elections. Although he failed to win a seat, he entered the Knesset on 11 May 1964 when Yitzhak Ben-Aharon was asked by the party to resign to allow Jabara to take his place. However, Jabara lost his seat in the 1965 elections.

He died in 1999.
