= Nicola Ziadeh =

Palestinian writer

- Born: 2 December 1907; Damascus
- Died: 27 July 2006 (aged 98)
- Education: University of London (Bachelor's degree, 1939; Doctorate, 1950
- Occupations: Historian, author, teacher
- Title: Professor

Nicola Ziadeh (Arabic: Arabic: نقولا زيادة, romanized: Nuqūlā Ziyādah; [nuˈqɔː.laː zɪˈjaː.da]; 2 December 1907 – 27 July 2006) was a historian and author of Palestinian origin, Lebanese nationality, born in Syria.

== Early life ==
Nicola Ziadeh was born in Bab Musalla neighborhood, one of the neighborhoods of Al-Midan area in Damascus. His parents were Palestinian from Nazareth. His father was an employee in the engineering department in the General Administration of the Hejaz railway in Damascus. At the beginning of the World War I, when he was eight years old, his father was recruited to fight with the Ottoman Army, and while his father was staying in one of the soldiers' gathering centers waiting to be sent to the battle fronts, his father became ill and died before going to the battlefront.

In 1917, after his father's death, his family returned to Nazareth, where he lived with his uncle, who took care of them. Then his uncle was killed by a bomb thrown by a British plane, so his mother was forced to search for work to support the family. she found work in Jenin, so the family moved to live there. Nicola did not attend any school in Jenin for two years because there was no school there, as the German army took over the only school in the town. He made it up by reading and self-education, so he read many books that he borrowed from his neighbor, such as the Taghribat Bani Hilal, the biography of Saif ibn Dhi Yazan, and One Thousand and One Nights. In 1919, a public school was opened, so Nicola enrolled in it. In 1921, he was accepted to study at the "Dar Al-muealimin" in Jerusalem.

Nicola graduated from the "Dar Al-muealimin" after three years and worked for several weeks in the Nazareth School (at the time he was 16 years old). Then he moved to work as a teacher in Tarshiha (Acre District) and worked there for one year, after which he joined Acre school in Acre in 1925. Despite the fact that his inclination to teach mathematics he was assigned to teach history and geography. This decision had an impact on his life, as he liked the subject of history. He read books on history and was also acquainted with some excavation missions for foreign antiquities in Palestine that were excavating in Acre and Baysan. He was keen to visit many archaeological sites in Palestine, and at the beginning of his life and considered himself a "historian under training". In 1930, he published an article in the "Al-Muqtatif Magazine" about the Battle of Megiddo.

== Nicola Ziadeh the teacher ==
In 1935, in fulfillment of his hopes, Nicolas was selected for a mission to study ancient history at the University of London. He spent nearly four years in Europe, of which about six months were at the Ludwig-Maximilians-Universität München in Germany. The university imposed on the student to learn two European languages other than English, so he chose German and old French. He obtained a bachelor's degree in 1939.

Nicola returned to Palestine in the summer of 1939, weeks before the start of World War II. During the eight years following his return, he taught ancient history and Arab history at the Arab College in Jerusalem. His first book, published in Cairo in 1943, was entitled "Pioneers of the Eastern Arabs in the Middle Ages" (original text: Ruwad Al-sharq Al-Arabi fi al-usur al-wusta). In those years, he also tried to transfer some of what he had learned in the West to his students through his lectures and books.

In 1947, he traveled again to the University of London to prepare for a doctorate. His interest had moved from classical history to Islamic history. During his stay in England, he wrote a number of articles dealing with various aspects of Arab history. Nicola spent two years in London preparing his doctorate on "Syria in the First Mamluk Era". In 1950, he presented his thesis and received his doctorate.

After the occupation of Palestine, Nicolas immigrated to Lebanon, where he joined the staff of the American University of Beirut. He was appointed as an assistant professor, and then a professor in 1958. He continued teaching there until 1973. At fifty-five years of age, he retired from the American University of Beirut, and supervised doctoral theses in Arab history at Saint Joseph University of Beirut until 1992. He also taught at the University of Jordan in Amman for two years from 1976 until 1978. Then he returned to Beirut to work at the Lebanese University as a lecturer and supervisor.

Haissam Khalil is related to Nicola Ziadeh.

== Works ==
Nicola Ziadeh has written more than 40 books on Arab and Islamic history. He has translated many history books from English into Arabic, including books by Arnold Toynbee. He has delivered about 150 articles and lectures at Arab and international conferences. His complete oeuvre has been collected and issued in 23 volumes. Some of his books are:

- "Pioneers of the Eastern Arabs in the Middle Ages" – (original text: Ruwad Al-sharq Al-Arabi fi al-usur al-wusta), Cairo 1943.
- "The Arab Dart" – (original text: Wathubat Al-Arab), Jerusalem 1945.
- "The Old World" – (original text: Al-alam al-qadim), in two parts, Jaffa 1942.
- "Pictures from Arab History" – (original text: Suar min al-tarikh Al-Arabi), Cairo 1946.
- "Historical Arab Personalities" – (original text: Shakhsiyat Arabiya tarikhiya), Jaffa 1946.
- "European Images" – (original text: Suar Urubbiyya), Jerusalem 1947.
- "The Medieval World in Europe" – (original text: Alim al-usur al-wusta fi Urubba), Jerusalem 1947.
- "Cyrenaica, the Eighth Arab State" – (original text: Bariqat al-dawla Al-Arabiya al-thamina), Beirut 1950.
- "Arabism in the Balance of Nationalism" – (original text: Al-uruba fi mizan al-qawmia), Beirut 1950.
- "Peaks of Arab Islamic Thought" – (original text: Qimam min al-fikr Al-Arabi Al-Islami), Beirut 1987.
- "Geography and Travels among the Arabs" – (original text: Al-jughrafia w al-rihlat ind Al-Arab), Beirut 1987.
- "Shamiyat: Syrian Studies in Civilization and History" – (original text: Shamiyat, Dirasat fi al-hadarat w al-tarikh), Beirut 1989.
- "Afriqiyat: African Studies in Morocco and Western Sudan" – (original text: Afriqiyat, Dirasat fi Al-Maghrib Al-Arabi w Al-Sudan Al-Gharbi), Beirut 1991.
- "Libnaniyat: Lebanese Studies in History and Pictures" – (original text: Libnaniyat, tarikh w suar), Beirut 1992.
- "My Days (Biography)" – (original text: Ayami (Syra Dhatyah)), Beirut 1992.
- "Mashreqiyat: Oriental Studies in Trade and Thought" – (original text: Mashreqiyat fi salat al-tijara w al-fikr), Beirut 1998.
- "The Search for God" – (original text: Fi sabil al-bahth an Allah), Beirut 2000.
- "Christianity and the Arabs" – (original text: Al-masihiya w al-Arab), Beirut 2001.
- "Greek Thought and Arab Culture: the Greek-Arabic translation movement in Baghdad and the early Abbasid society", Author: Dimitri Goutas; Translation: Nicola Ziadeh – 2003.

== Some of his articles ==
- Nicola Ziadeh, the secret of the Battle of Atlas. Al-Arabi Magazine, Issue No. 399
- Nicola Ziadeh, May Ziadeh: Identity and Belonging. Al-Arabi Magazine, Issue No. 496
- Nicola Ziadeh, producers of the Islamic civilization, Al-Arabi Magazine, Issue No. 509
- Nicola Ziadeh, producers of the Arab Islamic civilization. Al-Arabi Magazine, Issue No. 517
- Nicola Ziadeh, Al-Quds As I Knew It. Al-Arabi Magazine, Issue No. 571
- Nicola Ziadeh, November 2, 1917, the architect of the Jewish National in Palestine
