= Anbara Salam Khalidi =

Lebanese writer (1897–1986)

- عنبرة السلام الخالدي
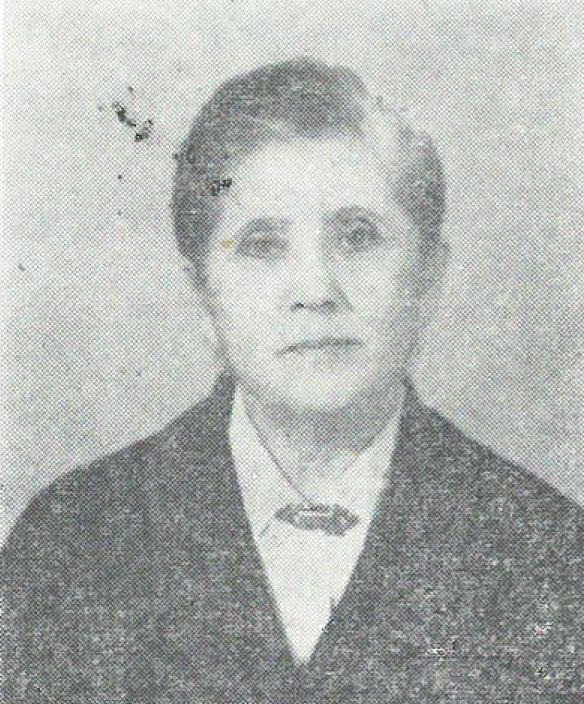
- Born: 4 August 1897; Beirut, Ottoman Empire
- Died: 1986 (aged 88–89); Beirut, Lebanon
- Citizenship: Lebanese
- Education: American University of Beirut
- Occupation: Translator
- Spouse: Ahmad Samih Khalidi (m. 1929; died 1951)
- Children: Walid Khalidi (step-child); Tarif Khalidi; Usama Khalidi
- Parent: Salim Ali Salam
- Relatives: Saeb Salam (brother); Anbara Salam (great-granddaughter)
- Writing career
- Language: Arabic
- Period: Late 1920s – 1980s
- Genre: Translations of classics

Anbara Al-Salam Al-Khalidi (Arabic: عنبرة السلام الخالدي; 4 August 1897 – May 1986) was a Lebanese feminist, translator, and author, who significantly contributed to the emancipation of Arab women.

== Early life and education ==
Khalidi was born into an eminent Sunni Lebanese family in Beirut in 1897. She was the daughter of Salim Ali Salam, a deputy in the Ottoman parliament and a merchant, and her mother was a member of the leading families, namely the Barbir and Aghars. Her brother Saeb Salam served as the prime minister. Two of her brothers also held cabinet posts.

In 1913 during the First Arab Congress in Paris Khalidi, along with two other women, sent a telegram to the congress. This telegram was the first message that was read aloud. She received a modern education and learned French. She and her siblings attended the Anglican Syrian College in Ras Beirut, which is the predecessor of the American University of Beirut. From 1925 to 1927 she studied in the United Kingdom.

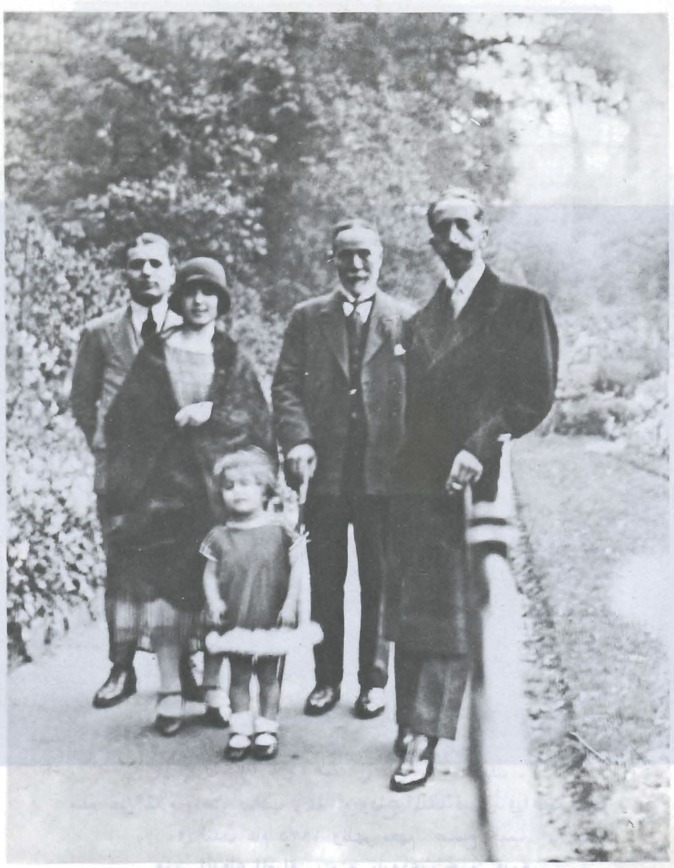
Salim Ali Salam with King Faisal I of Iraq in Richmond Park in London in 1925, along with Salim's son Saeb Salam and daughters Anbara and Rasha. Anbara can be seen wearing an elegant cloche hat and a mid-calf skirt, contrary to prevailing social conventions in Beirut at the time.

== Activities ==
After returning to Beirut, Khalidi joined the pioneering women's movement called Society for Women's Renaissance. She worked there on advancing women's role in society and politics, on encouraging national Lebanese products of textiles and fashion, and on establishing schools for women and advocating for women education.

She was the first to translate Homer's Odyssey and Virgil's Aeneid into Arabic.

Her memoir was published in 1978 with the title of Jawalah fil Dhikrayat Baynah Lubnan Wa Filastin (Arabic: A Tour of Memories of Lebanon and Palestine). It was translated into English in 2013 under the title of Memoirs of an Early Arab Feminist. In her memoir, Khalidi emphasized the negative effects the activities of Jamal Pasha, Ottoman ruler of Syria, had on her family and her childhood.

== Personal life and death ==
Anbara Salam married a Palestinian educator, Ahmad Samih Al Khalidi (died 1951) in 1929. It was his second marriage. He was the principal of the Arab College in Jerusalem in Mandatory Palestine. They settled in Jerusalem and then in Beirut. She died in Beirut in May 1986.

== Dedication ==
Anbara Salam Khalidi was the subject of a Google Doodle on 4 August 2018, the 121st anniversary of her birth.
