= Arab College (Jerusalem) =

Secondary school in Jerusalem (1918–1948)

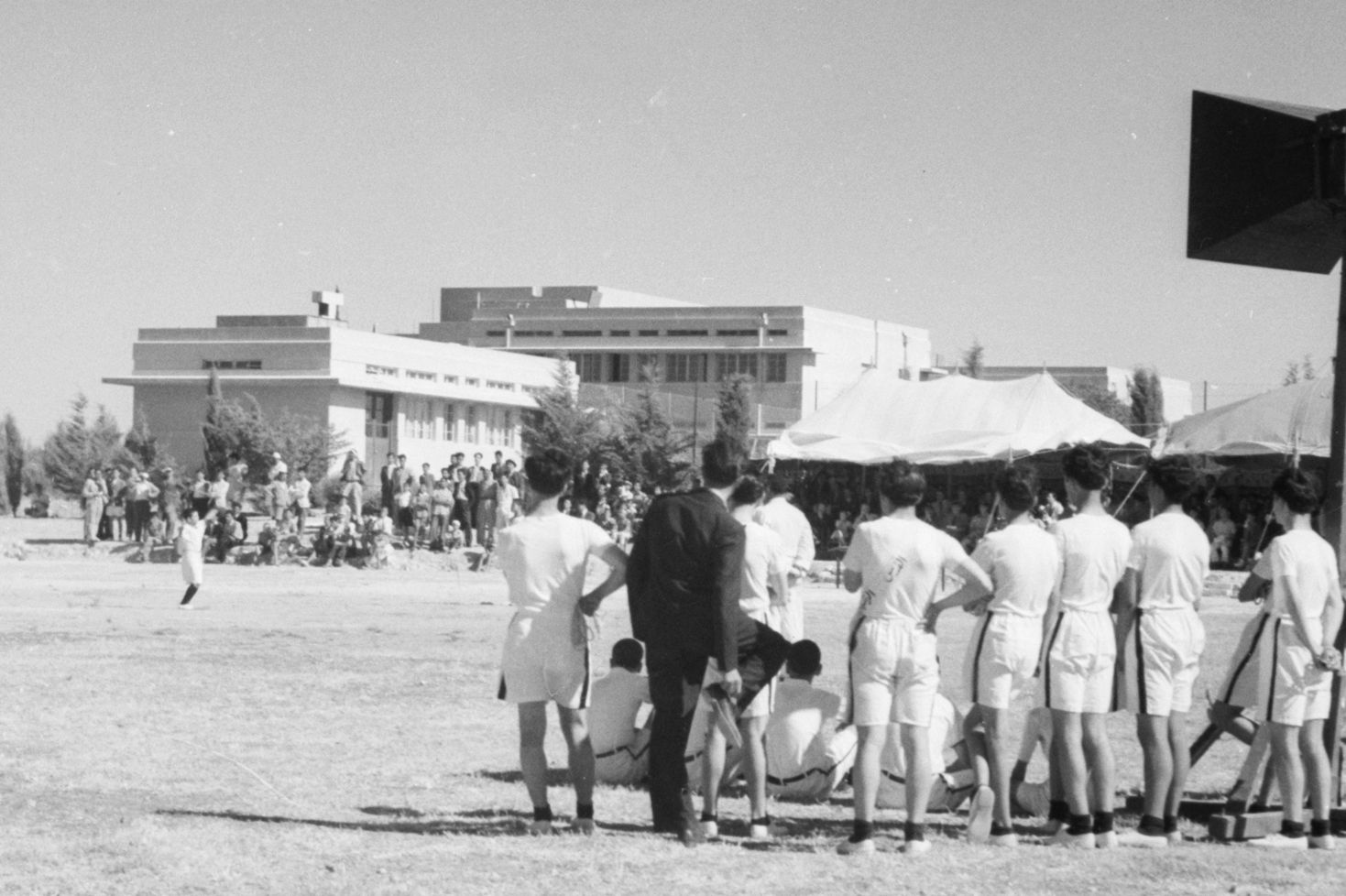
The college during a sports event in 1942

The Arab College in Jerusalem was a secondary school in British Mandatory Palestine. The Arab College operated from 1918 until 1948, when it was swept away during the 1948 Arab–Israeli War.

== History ==
Formally established in 1926 on the site of the British-founded Teacher Training Academy, the college moved to Jabal al-Mukabbir in 1935. It rarely exceeded 100 students, and its top graduates went on to British universities or the American University of Beirut.

Among the educational institutions introduced under British rule in Palestine was the Government Arab College in Jerusalem. Initially, the chief role of the Arab College was to train teachers for the new primary schools opening around the country. For that reason, it was sometimes referred to as a teachers' training college.

For a time its principal was Ahmad Samih Khalidi, father of Walid Khalidi and Tarif Khalidi. It used to be located at Bab al-Zahirah (Herod's Gate) in Jerusalem. Later it moved to Jabal al-Mukabbir, south of Jerusalem. The college badge was a falcon clutching an ink-horn.

Palestinian historian Walid Khalidi described the college as "the highest Palestinian educational institution in the country." It was distinguished for its stringent admissions requirements and equal emphasis on Islamic-Arab heritage and Western classical and liberal traditions. He writes that the end of the Mandate, it was a university-level college; whose graduates qualified for London University's B.A. degree. Many were sent on scholarship to the United Kingdom." After the school closed, the buildings were used as UN headquarters.

A common practice was for students to visit a nearby orchard during free time, in which to study. It provided a quiet atmosphere, optimal for the rigorous curriculum. According to former graduate Sadiq Ibrahim ‘Odeh, “We grew and the trees grew with us, and now we don‘t know what has happened to them. Many must have grown old and tired and died just like those Arab college students who loved them and sat underneath them.”

== Alumni ==
- Ihsan Abbas
- Haidar Abdel-Shafi
- Abd el-Aziz el-Zoubi
- Halil-Salim Jabara
- Ismail Khalidi
- Salem Hanna Khamis
- Abdullah Rimawi
- Hasib Sabbagh
- Jabra Ibrahim Jabra
- Nicola Ziadeh (who later returned to join the teaching faculty)
- Anwar Nuseibeh
- Hanna Abu-Hanna
