= All That Remains: The Palestinian Villages Occupied and Depopulated by Israel in 1948 =

1992 reference book

- Editors: Walid Khalidi
- Language: English
- Pages: 636
- ISBN: 0-887-28224-5

All That Remains: The Palestinian Villages Occupied and Depopulated by Israel in 1948 is a 1992 reference book edited by the Palestinian historian Walid Khalidi, with contributions from several other researchers, that describes 418 Palestinian villages that were destroyed or depopulated in the 1948 Palestinian expulsion and flight, the central component of the Nakba. All That Remains was published by the Institute for Palestine Studies in English in 1992 and in Arabic in 1997.

== Methodology ==
The methodology for the documentation relied extensively on field research. The research was a collaborative effort from the Institute for Palestine Studies, Birzeit University, and the Galilee Center for Social Research and lasted approximately six years. Researchers visited every site and photographed the remains and the text incorporates archive documents from Arab travelers, government records from the periods of Ottoman and British rule, and Israeli military records.

== Contents and scope ==
The text of All That Remains focuses on the Palestinian villages, with each village listed under its own entry with relevant statistical data, narrative information, information on the military operations that led to each village's conquest, and descriptions of the site at the time of the project. The book also contains hundreds of photographs, several maps, and appendices. The book also traces the Hebraization of Palestinian place names. As Ann M. Lesch notes, "In the Jerusalem district alone, twenty per cent of the 38 destroyed villages now have Hebrew names: Kasla became Kesalon; Sar'a is Tzor'a; Saris is Shoresh; Suba is Tzova."

== Translations ==
It was published in Arabic under the title Kay lā nansá : qurá Filasṭīn allatī dammaratʹhā Isrāʼīl sanat 1948 wa-asmāʼ shuhadāʼihā (Arabic: كي لا ننسى : قرى فلسطين التي دمرتها اسرائيل سنة 1948 واسماء شهدائها).
