= Salim Ali Salam =

Lebanese politician (1868–1938)

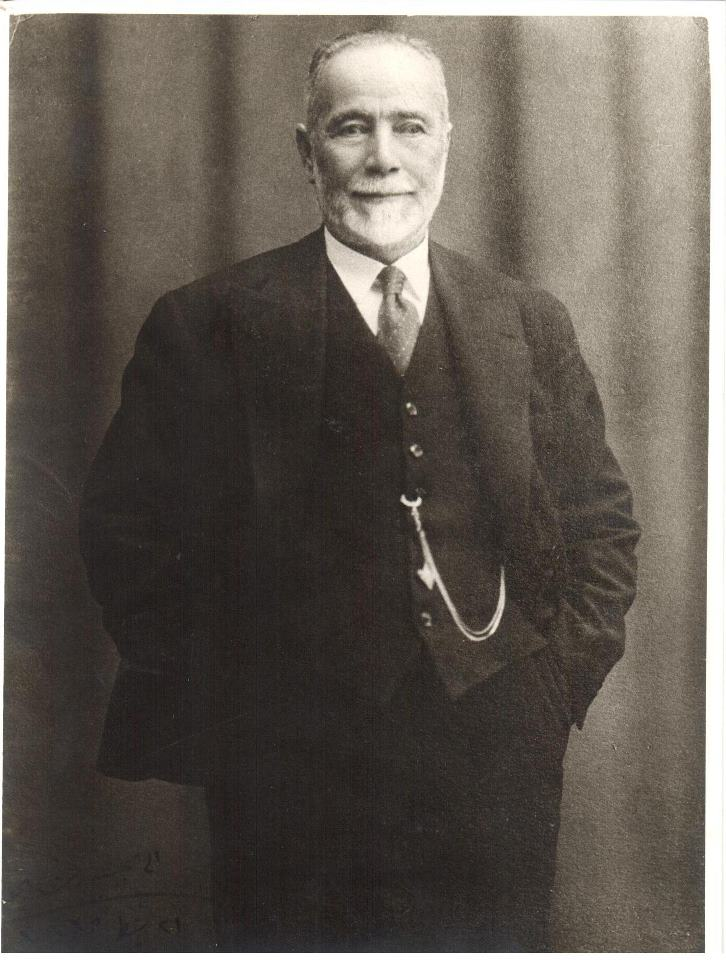
Portrait picture of Salim Ali Al-Salam

Salim Ali Al-Salam (Arabic: سليم علي السلام; 1868–1938), also known by the kunya Abu Ali Salam (أبو علي السلام), was a prominent figure in Beirut at the turn of the 20th century who held numerous public positions, including deputy from Beirut to the Ottoman Parliament, President of the Municipality of Beirut, and President of the Muslim Society of Benevolent Intentions (al-Makassed). He was the leader of the "Beirut Reform Movement," which called for the decentralization and modernization of the Ottoman Empire, and was also a member of the Executive Committee of the First Arab Congress which met in Paris in 1913 and formulated Arab national demands. He opposed Ottoman political repression during World War I, and the French Mandate of the post-war period. He stood out for his enlightened outlook and for his ability to communicate effectively with his contemporaries. He received the Ottoman nobility title of Bey. Today, a main avenue in Beirut is named after him.

== Early life ==
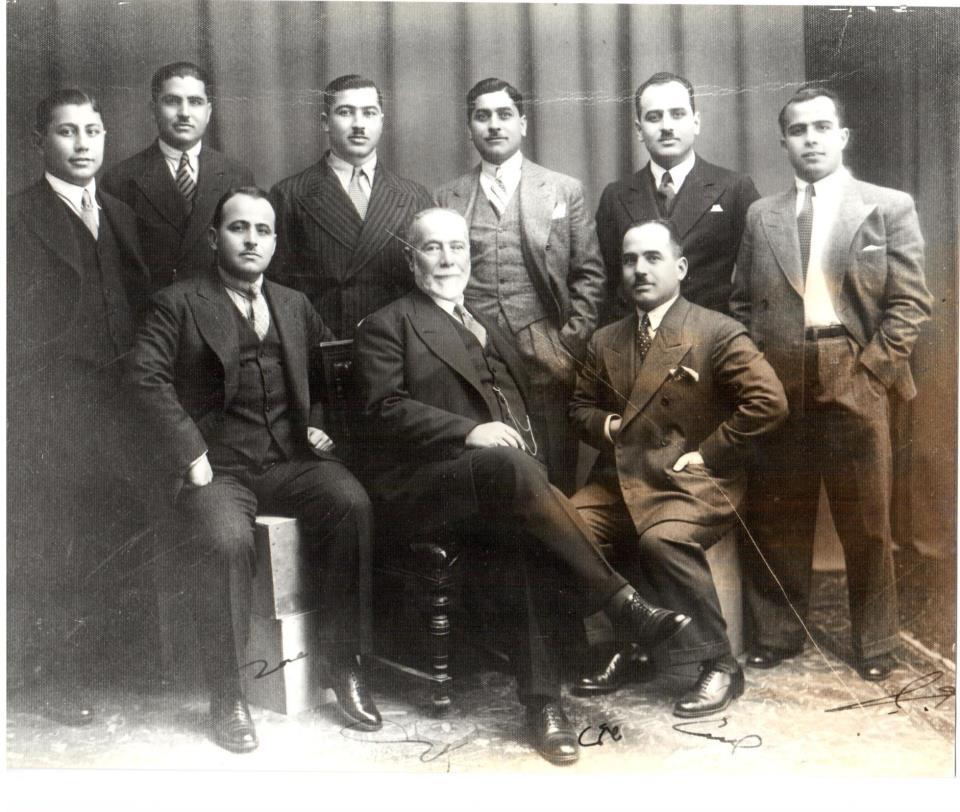
Salim Ali Salam with his sons

Salam was first sent to a Christian missionary school where he studied French and then to an Ottoman school where he studied Turkish. His father died when he was only seventeen years of age, at which point he took over the family business. Two years later, he married Kulthum Barbir, the granddaughter of Ahmad Al Agharr who had held at one and the same time in Beirut the positions of mufti, qadi, and naqib al-ashraf (head of the order of the descendants of Muhammad). Together they had twelve children: Ali, Muhieddine, Fatima, Muhammad, Anbara, Misbah, Omar, Saeb, Abdallah, Fouad, Malik, and Rasha. One of his sons, Malik, married the sister of Rashid Karami who served as the prime minister for ten times.

Salam became a successful merchant, mostly trading in staples from his office located in the seaport area of Beirut. In addition, he undertook several construction and agricultural projects. Owing to the economic position that he came to occupy, he was appointed member of the Chamber of Commerce in 1895, President of the Agricultural Bank in 1900, and Vice President of the Court of Commerce in 1903.

== Beiruti notable with a modern outlook ==
The French Consul General in Beirut, M. Couget, described Salim Salam, in an annex to a dispatch addressed to the French Minister of Foreign Affairs, M. Pichon, dated May 16, 1913, as follows:

Salim Salam, more commonly called Abu Ali, is one of those hardcore Beirutis, with a coarse language but so full of color and flavor. His intelligence is totally remarkable. His speech, while simple, is eloquent and highly persuasive. His entire personality exudes strength, courage and decisiveness. Wherever he finds himself he is always the heart and soul of the meeting, despite his cursory education. His influence over his coreligionists and even upon others is undeniable. Had this man been born and brought up in a free country, he would surely have become somebody. Compulsive speculation is his particular trait. One time he is in calm and flat financial waters and on another he is heading full sails towards the million. At this moment, he seems to be making good headway despite some minor ups and downs. In brief, he is a true male and an incomparable leader.

According to the foremost Lebanese historian, Kamal Salibi, "among the Moslem notables of Beirut at the turn of the century few communicated with their fellow men as easily and readily as Salim Ali Salam." Salibi explains that "hardly anything happened in the city, the sanjak, or the vilayet without his knowledge or participation." Salibi describes Salam as "a man of remarkably modern outlook, cautious and shrewd yet open-minded and completely lacking in prejudice, receptive of new ideas, aggressive and capable of making good use of opportunity, a born positivist, a believer in progress, and an expert breaker of Gordian knots."

Salibi goes on to relate the following: "As he rose in society, Abu Ali was careful not to lose the common touch … While his peers vied with one another in building luxurious mansions out of town, Abu Ali remodeled and enlarged his father's house in al-Musaytiba, and later added on to it a third floor, so that it now dominated the neighborhood … His sons and daughters were encouraged to identify themselves with the neighborhood and become intimately acquainted with it … The men of the neighborhood came to him with their problems; during the month of Ramadan, he would invite them to break the day's fast at his table."

Salibi also relates the following: "Abu Ali did not flee the social restrictions of al-Musaytiba, but he was personally uninhibited, full of self-confidence and daring, and, though conventionally religious, completely unfanatical. From his home base in the heart of Moslem Beirut, he developed cordial friendships with the Greek Orthodox archbishop of the city and the leading Christian notables of al-Ashrafiyya; he would ride over to call on them informally, in company with his growing brood of sons, and received informal visits from them in return. As a boy, his father had made it clear to him that it was not wrong for a Moslem to seek modern instruction in a Christian school, even if it meant attending compulsory church services; now he sent his own sons to the Syrian Protestant College [now the American University of Beirut], against strong remonstrances from his more conservative Moslem associates. More than that, a Greek Catholic priest came regularly to his house to teach his sons French, and a leading Maronite literary figure of the day, Abdallah al-Bustani, tutored his daughter Anbara in Arabic language and literature. In 1910, Abu Ali took another unprecedented step: he sent his eldest son, Ali, to study agricultural engineering in England."

Similarly to Salibi, Samir Kassir, a Lebanese journalist and leading historian of Beirut who was assassinated in 2005, wrote that Salim Salam was "the most visible man of Beirut … a prosperous man who was at the crossroads of all public initiatives and was very much aware of all that took place in Beirut and the whole of the province." In terms of social development at the turn of the century, Kassir explains that "the greatest metamorphosis of all was the one brought about by the emergence of Salim Salam as a public figure – and by his way of life." Kassir depicts Salam as "elegant in manner and possessed of a noble bearing, in public always dressed in the European style while wearing the Ottoman tarbush."

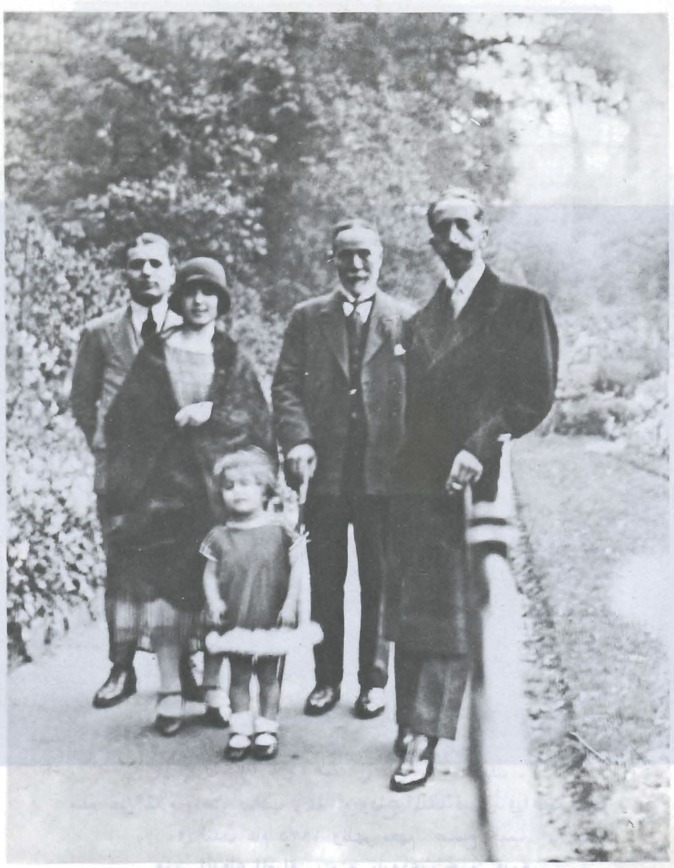
Salim Ali Salam with King Faisal I of Iraq in Richmond Park in London in 1925, along with Salim's son Saeb Salam and daughters Anbara and Rasha. Anbara can be seen wearing an elegant cloche hat and a mid-calf skirt, contrary to prevailing social conventions in Beirut at the time.

He says that "Salim Salam embodied a mixture of traditional virtues and new values. Throughout his life he was to maintain a piety attested by his daily observance of religious ritual and his reading of sacred texts, while at the same time displaying an openness of mind that tempered the conservatism of his social environment."

Kassir also explains that "Salim Salam's choice of friends was proof of his religious tolerance at a time when communal tensions were intensified by the misfortunes of the Ottoman Empire and the destabilization of the Muslim community by Western penetration. Salam made it a point of establishing solid relationships with both the Orthodox archbishop of Beirut, Monsignor Misarra, and Habib Pasha al-Saad, the Maronite president of the administrative council of the Mutasarrifate of Mount Lebanon." As evidence of the deep-seated trust that existed between Salim Salam and the leaders of the Christian community, Kassir reports that "the Orthodox bishop of Beirut, preparing to set off on a trip, instructed the dignitaries of his community to defer to the judgment of Salim Salam during his absence."

Kassir also recounts that Salim Salam's eldest daughter, Anbara, "in the 1920s was to be the first Muslim woman in Lebanon to go out in public unveiled" and that "in the meantime she had been sent to study in London, together with her younger sister; a photograph taken during her stay there shows Anbara wearing an elegant cloche hat and a mid-calf skirt in the company of her father, her brother Saeb, and King Faisal I of Iraq – proof that Salam readily accepted the idea of women doing away with the veil, in defiance of prevailing social conventions in Beirut." In her autobiography, Anbara reveals that she had consulted with her father prior to removing the veil for the first time in public, during a lecture she gave on her impressions of her time in England, and that he had said to her to do as she saw fit.

== President of the municipality of Beirut ==
Salim Salam became president of the Municipality of Beirut in 1908 – the highest office in the land that a local from Beirut could attain. He was also a member of the administrative council of the vilayet of Beirut.

In his memoirs, he recounts that upon taking office he recognized that the municipality "was in a state of trouble, as there was no money in its coffers, debts were accruing, roads were in a very poor condition, and the financial and moral base of the municipality had eroded."

His tenure was marked by comprehensive reforms and by a hands-on approach to the everyday needs of the city.

== President of the Muslim Society of Benevolent Intentions (al-Makassed) ==
Salim Salam became president of al-Makassed in 1909 – a leading charitable organization that promotes modern education among the Muslims of Beirut.

According to Salibi, "the new Maqasid board, under the presidency of Abu Ali, proceeded to draft new by-laws for the society, to secure for it full legal recognition, and to have its various properties officially registered in its name. Its schools were then re-organized: a boys' school was established in Zuqaq al-Blat with a Druze, Arif Bey Nakad, as principal; and girls' school was established at Hawuz al-Wilaya with a Protestant, Julia Tu'ma, as principal. It was typical of Abu Ali to act against strong objections and appoint non-Moslems (a Druze and a Christian) to head the new Maqasid schools when he found no Moslems suited for the job."

According to Hassaan Hallak, Salim Salam's biographer, "during his presidency, Salim Salam improved the instruction in the schools of al-Makassed both in terms of the pedagogical methods and in terms of the quality of the teachers and directors by hiring individuals with higher educational degrees and specialized skills … He also developed the practices of the organization and increased its revenues which came to exceed 180 thousand piasters in 1912, after it had been suffering from the burden of deficit and deterioration for years."

== Leader of the Beirut Reform Movement ==
At the inaugural meeting of the (Beirut) Reform Movement, sometimes called the Beirut Reform Society, which took place on 12 January 1913 in the municipality building, Salim Salam was elected as the executive officer of the movement along with Petro Trad; Ayoub Tabet was elected as its secretary.

The Reform Movement advocated leaving the internal affairs of the Arab provinces in the hands of the local people, as well as relying on European advisors in each province. Salam had already called for this approach in an article published in Al-Ittihad al-Uthmani a year before the inception of the Reform Movement.

Significantly, the list of reforms called for by the movement included granting the locally elected General Council of the province the right to grant licenses for the formation of joint stock companies to undertake general development projects relating to any aspect of the economy, from commerce, to industry, to agriculture. Clearly, the inhabitants of Beirut, both Muslims and Christians alike, felt that the highly centralized Ottoman administration was hindering their business activity.

== Executive Committee Member of the First Arab Congress ==
The First Arab Congress convened on 18 June 1913 in Paris, at the Société de Géographie. Salim Salam was part of the delegation from Beirut, which included three Muslims and three Christians, and was elected as a member of the Executive Committee of the Congress.

The Congress was formed partly in response to Ottoman oppression, which had intensified with the arrival of the Young Turks to power in 1908. The Congress demanded: making Arabic an official language in the Arab provinces, employing Arab troops in their home provinces except in times of war, and granting greater powers to the local Arab provincial governments. Although historians disagree about when exactly Arab nationalism began, the Arab Congress of 1913 marked a turning point in terms of the crystallization and expression of a distinct Arab identity.

Salam was also part of the delegation chosen by the Congress to convey its positions to Stéphen Pichon, the French Minister of Foreign Affairs, and to Sultan Mehmed Reshad, the ruler of the Ottoman Empire. He returned to Beirut on 2 September 1913 to a welcoming crowd.

== Deputy to the Ottoman Parliament ==
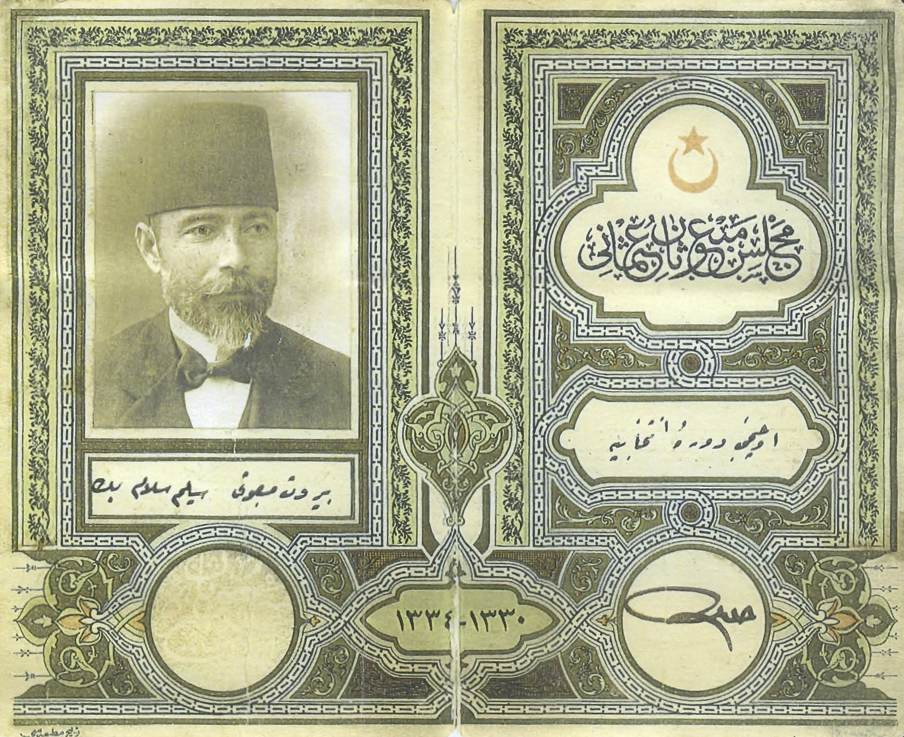
Identity Card of Salim Ali Salam as a Member from Beirut to the Ottoman Parliament

On 9 April 1914, Salim Salim was elected deputy from Beirut to the Ottoman parliament, on the same list as Michel Sursock and Kamel al-Asaad, and running against a list headed by Rida Al Solh.

Salim Salam exerted himself to form an Arab Bloc in the Ottoman parliament. In his memoirs, he writes, "I rented a beautiful house on the Bosphorus … with the intention of using the upper floor for living accommodation and the lower floor for the meeting of… the Arab deputies…; but the outbreak of the war [World War I] disrupted everything."

The most important contribution of Salam to the last pre-war session of parliament was a long speech in which he urged that more serious attention be paid to public education in the Arab provinces, including the education of women:

"If we compare what is spent on education in foreign countries, and what we ourselves spend, the causes of their advancement and our backwardness, their success and our decline, will become clear… On behalf of my electorate, I tell you that I have been sent to accept any tax that may be imposed to spend on education… As for the girls' schools, what can I say about them? ... Women are the mainstay of cultivation (al-hayat al-adabiyya) and the pillars of society (al-haya al-ijtimaiyya); while they remain backward, the whole nation will be backward."

== Opponent of Ottoman Political Repression ==
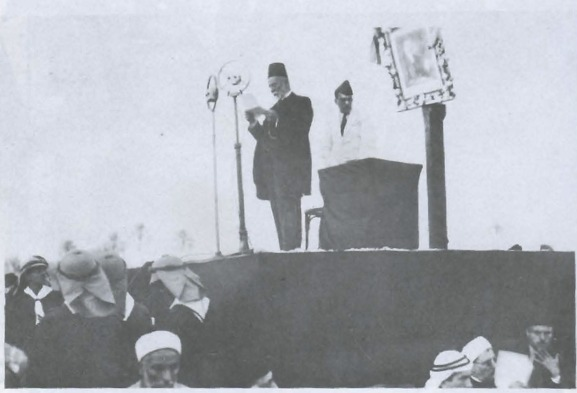
Salim Ali Salam delivering a funeral oration for King Faisal I of Iraq on behalf of the Lebanese delegation that traveled to Baghdad in September 1933

Salim Salam was staunchly opposed to the political repression exercised by Jamal Pasha, the commander of the Ottoman fourth army during World War I, who was responsible for a campaign of persecution, including the hanging of many Arab nationalists on 6 May 1916 in Damascus and Beirut. In Beirut, the place of their hanging has since been renamed Martyrs' Square.

In his memoirs, Salim Salam recalls the following: "Jamal Pasha resumed his campaign of vengeance; he began to imprison most Arab personalities, charging them with treason against the State. His real intent was to cut off the thoughtful heads, so that, as he put it, the Arabs would never again emerge as a force, and no one would be left to claim for them their rights … After returning to Beirut [from Istanbul], I was summoned … to Damascus to greet Jamal Pasha … I took the train …, and upon reaching Aley we found that the whole train was reserved for the prisoners there to take them to Damascus … When I saw them, I realized that they were taking them to Damascus to put them to death. So … I said to myself: how shall I be able to meet with this butcher on the day on which he will be slaughtering the notables of the country? And how will I be able to converse with him? … Upon arriving in Damascus, I tried hard to see him that same evening, before anything happened, but was not successful. The next morning all was over, and the … notables who had been brought over from Aley were strung up on the gallows."

Increasingly disenchanted with Ottoman rule, Salam supported the Arab Revolt, launched by Sharif Hussein of Mecca in 1916 and led by his son Emir Faisal, who later became King Faisal I of Iraq.

With the end of World War I approaching, Salam went to see the Ottoman governor of Beirut, Ismail Hakki Bey, accompanied by Ahmad Mukhtar Bayhum and Alfred Sursock. Negotiations lasted all night, but they finally managed to convince the governor to leave the city. He left at six o'clock in the morning on 1 October 1918, escorted to the borders by one of Salam's sons.

== Opponent of the French Mandate ==
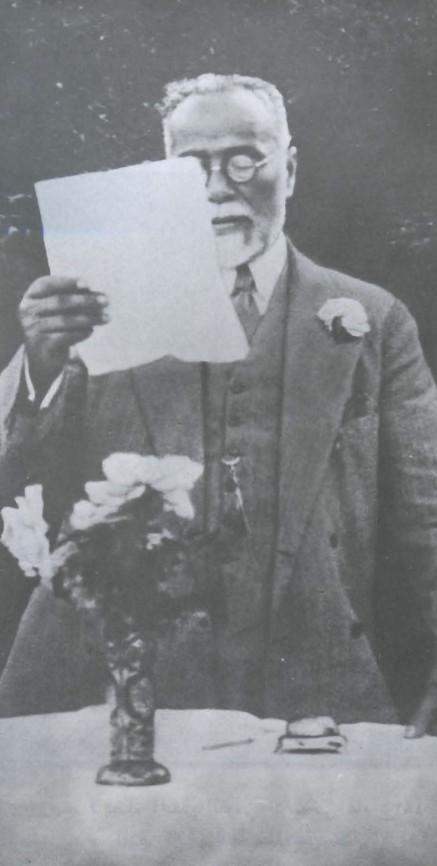
Salim Ali Salam delivering his speech at the "Conference of the Coast and the Four Districts" of March 1936

With the departure of the Ottoman governor, an Arab government in Beirut was announced. Samir Kassir observes that, while it was headed by Umar Da'uq, Salam remained the strong man who "presided over the ceremony at which the Arab colors were raised at the Sérail, on 6 October, before proceeding to the Shuwayfat Plain south of the city to welcome Shukri Ayubi, whom Faysal had named governor general of Beirut and Mount Lebanon. Receiving Ayubi the next day at his home in Musaytbeh, Salam requested that his friend Habib Pasha al-Saad, president of the dissolved administrative council of the Mutasarrifate, be allowed to serve as the governor of Mount Lebanon. Saad took an oath of allegiance to Faysal during an investiture ceremony that took place later the same day at the Seraglio of Baabda before the hoisting of the Arab colors there." But on 10 October, the French army entered the city of Beirut, assumed control of the government, and took down the Arab flag.

As an outspoken opponent of the French mandate, Salam was arrested twice: once in 1919 when he was imprisoned for 4 months, and a second time in 1922, when he was sent into exile to the village of Douma in northern Lebanon for 5 months.

He organized two popular assemblies, "The Conferences of the Coast and the Four Districts" (Mu'tamarat Al-Sahel), in November 1933 and March 1936, denouncing French rule and calling for independence and Arab unity.
