= Usama al-Khalidi =

Arab biochemist

Usama Al-Khalidi (Arabic: أسامة الخالدي; April 20, 1932 – November 11, 2010) was an Arab biochemist who contributed significantly to the development of scientific institutions in Jordan and the wider Middle East.

== Family and early life ==
Al-Khalidi was born in Jerusalem on April 20, 1932. His mother was Lebanese feminist writer Anbara Salam Khalidi (1897–1986), and his father was Palestinian educator Ahmad Samih Al Khalidi (1896-1951). Usama was not the only child to go on to academic pursuits: his half-brother Walid Khalidi and brother Tarif Khalidi are both Palestinian historians. He also had two sisters, Randa and Karma.

== Early career: American University of Beirut ==
Al-Khalidi obtained his bachelor's and master's of science from the American University of Beirut (AUB) and his Ph.D. from the University of Michigan. He then returned to teach at AUB, serving as professor and chairman of the Biochemistry Department. His research during this period covered such topics as medical biochemistry, animal tissue metabolism, microbial biosynthesis, and metabolism of simple compounds. Specifically, he researched riboflavin biosynthesis, acetoin metabolism in mammals, acetyl-coA metabolism in liver supernatant, brain metabolism of acetoacetate and glucose, and serum guanase. He published extensively on these topics in the 1960s and 70s.

Overall, al-Khalidi was part of an era of great change for the AUB Biochemistry Department, which only began awarding doctoral degrees in 1966. This was among the first doctoral programs at the university.

== Later career ==
Al-Khalidi was a polymath. His interests also included medical and regional history, such as can be seen in his 1997 co-authorship of "Medical records, patients outcome, and peer review in eleventh-century Arab medicine" with Kamel M. Ajlouni for the Annals of Saudi Medicine. In 1999, al-Khalidi was among the founding members of the Jordanian Society for Scientific Research, Entrepreneurship, and Creativity.

== Honors ==
The Middle East Medical Association held an "Usama al-Khalidi Celebration Day" on April 24, 2010 in Beirut, just a few months prior to his passing. The Newton-Khalidi Fund of the UK Department for Business, Energy and Industrial Strategy (BEIS) in Jordan is named in his honor in 2017 during the World Science Forum in Dead Sea, Jordan. In 2015, the Usama al-Khalidi Endowed Award was established at the American University of Beirut, to be given to an outstanding senior majoring in biology.
