= Tarif Khalidi =

Palestinian historian (born 1938)

Tarif Khalidi طريف الخالدي
- Born: 24 January 1938 (age 88); Jerusalem, Mandatory Palestine
- Education: University College, Oxford University of Chicago
- Occupations: Scholar of islamic history and Arabic studies
- Known for: His English translation of the Qur'an, and other Islamic scholarship including The Muslim Jesus, Arabic Historical Thought in the Classical Period and Images of Muhammad

Tarif Khalidi (Arabic: طريف الخالدي; born 24 January 1938) is a Palestinian historian who now holds the Shaykh Zayid Chair in Islamic and Arabic Studies at the American University of Beirut in Lebanon.

== Family ==
Khalidi is the son of Ahmad Samih Khalidi (1896–1951) and Anbara Salam (1897–1986), brother of Usama al-Khalidi and half-brother of Walid Khalidi. His sister is Randa al-Fattal, a Palestinian-Syrian author, playwright and political activist. Palestinian-American historian Rashid Khalidi is Tarif's first cousin.

Khalidi's son, Muhammad Ali Khalidi, is a philosophy professor at York University. His daughter, Aliya Khalidi, is a lecturer at the Lebanese American University. The Khalidi family has lived in Jerusalem since the eleventh century and is noted for a long line of judges and scholars. Tarif's father was principal of the Government Arab College in Jerusalem from 1925 until 1948. He also served as Deputy Director of Education under the British Mandate. He was the author of several works on educational theory and on Palestinian history.

Khalidi's mother came from a Beiruti political family. She was a pioneer feminist, activist and writer; and the first Muslim woman in Greater Syria (Syria, Lebanon, Jordan and Palestine) to publicly remove her veil in 1927. She also translated several literary works into Arabic, including Homer's Iliad and Odyssey, and published her memoirs in 1978.

Khalidi and his family had their home stolen by settlers in April 1948 and sought refuge in Beirut, Lebanon.

== Academic career ==
In 1952, Khalidi attended Haileybury College in Hertford, England where he was on the classical side (Latin, Greek and Ancient History). He went on to University College, Oxford, where he received a B.A. in Modern History in 1960 and his master's degree three years later. Between 1960 and 1966, he was an instructor of Cultural Studies at the American University of Beirut.

Khalidi received a PhD in Islamic Studies from the University of Chicago in 1970. That year he returned to AUB as an assistant professor in the History Department. He taught at AUB through the Lebanese Civil War with a brief departure from 1985 to 1986 to become a senior research associate at St. Antony's College, Oxford.

In 1996 he was named the Sir Thomas Adams's Professor of Arabic and a fellow of King's College, Cambridge as well as director of the Center of Middle Eastern Studies there.

He returned to AUB again in 2002 to occupy his position as Shaykh Zayid Chair at the Center for Arab and Middle East Studies.

Khalidi wrote an influential paper on Palestinian Historiography from 1900 to 1948 in which he argued that much of the historical writing came to centre on the history of the Arabs and of Palestine, in an attempt to re-define the place that Palestine occupied in the Arab world in general and to emphasise its ties to Egypt and Syria in particular.

== Publications ==
Books

- (Co-editor) Al-Jahiz: A Muslim Humanist for our Time (Würzburg/Beirut: Ergon Verlag, 2009).
- Images of Muhammad: Narratives of the Prophet in Islam Across the Centuries (New York: Doubleday, 2009). ISBN 978-0-385-51816-1
- The Qur’an: A New Translation (London:Penguin Classics, 2008). ISBN 978-1-84614-021-1
- The Muslim Jesus; Sayings and Stories in Islamic Literature (Cambridge, Mass.:Harvard University Press, 2001). ISBN 978-0-674-00477-1
- Arabic Historical Thought in the Classical Period (Cambridge: Cambridge University Press, 1994). ISBN 978-0-521-58938-3
- Classical Arab Islam (Princeton: Darwin Press, 1985). ISBN 978-0-87850-048-2
- Editor, Land Tenure and Social Transformation in the Middle East ( Beirut: American University of Beirut, 1984). ISBN 978-0-8156-6071-2
- A Study in the Meaning and Method of History (in Arabic; Beirut: Dar al-Tali`a, 1982).
- Studies in the History of Arabic Islamic Culture (in Arabic; Beirut: Dar al-Tali`a, 1977).
- Islamic Historiography: The Histories of Mas`udi (Albany: SUNY Press, 1975). ISBN 978-0-87395-282-8
- Mas`udi, Muruj al-Dhahab (English translation on-line, 2020).

Journal articles

- "A World Historian and his Vision: at-Tabari, the Qur’an and History”, Al-Abhath, vol.55–56 (2007–2008).
- "Death and the Badi` in Early `Abbasid Poetry: The Elegy for al-Numayri by `Abdullah ibn al-Mu`tazz" (with Maher Jarrar), Al-Abhath, vol. 54 (2006).
- "Jesus, Islam and World Dialogue", Concilium, 39/4 (October 2003).
- "Poetry and Identity in the Umayyad Age" (with S.S.Agha), Al-Abhath, vol.50–51, (2002–2003).
- Article "Arabs", Encyclopedia of the Qur'an, ed. J.D.McAuliffe, Leiden: Brill, 2002.
- "Reflections on Periodisation in Arabic Historiography", The Medieval History Journal, vol.1, number 1 (Jan–June 1998).
- "Islamic Views of the West in the Middle Ages", Studies in Interreligious Dialogue (The Netherlands), 5/1995/1.
