= Walid Khalidi =

Palestinian historian (1925–2026)

- وليد خالدي
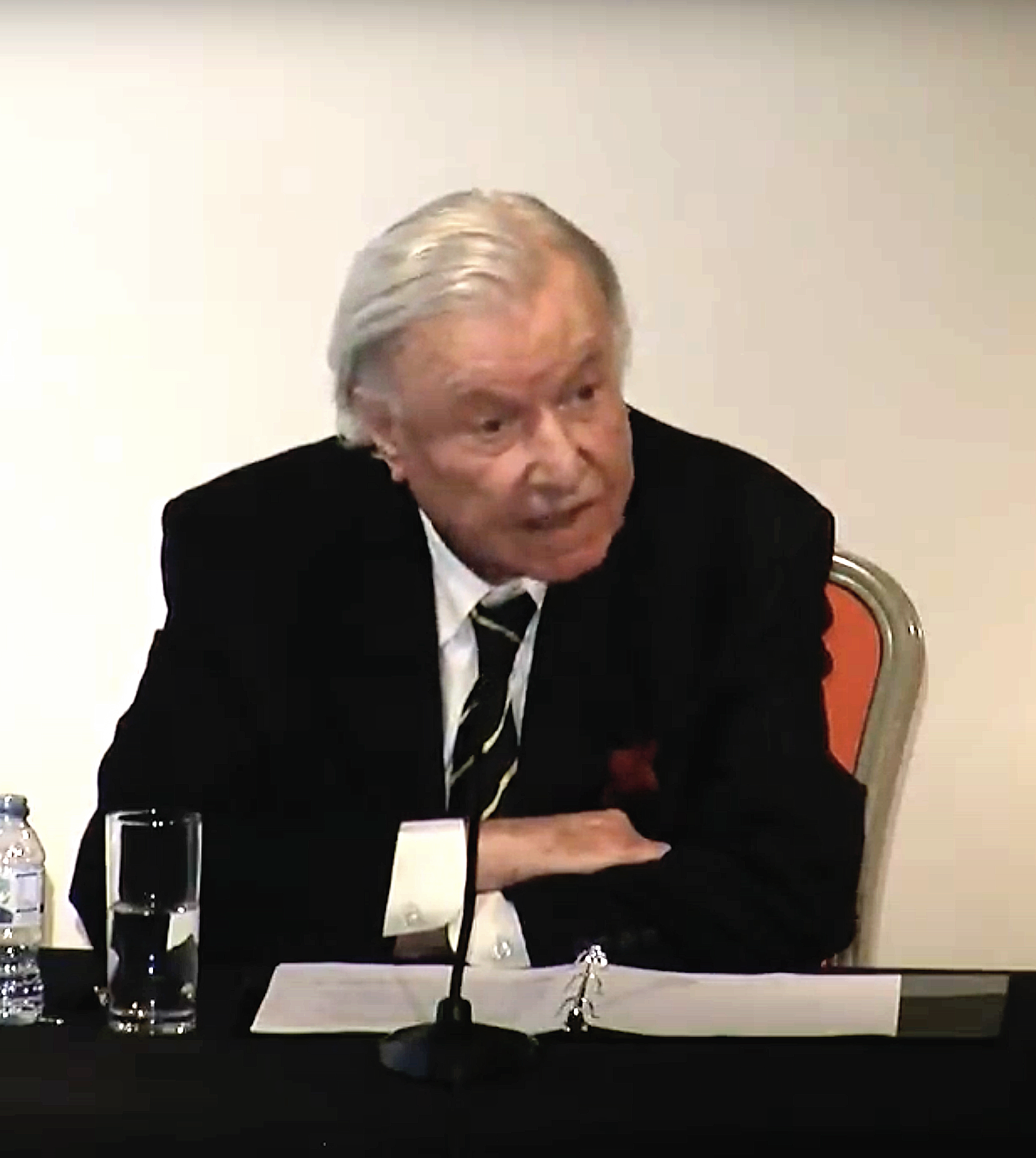
- Khalidi at SOAS in 2014
- Born: 16 July 1925; Jerusalem, Mandatory Palestine
- Died: 8 March 2026 (aged 100); Cambridge, Massachusetts, U.S.
- Occupation: Historian
- Parent: Anbara Salam Khalidi (stepmother)
- Relatives: Tarif Khalidi (half-brother); Usama al-Khalidi (half-brother); Rashid Khalidi (cousin)

Walid Khalidi (Arabic: وليد خالدي; 16 July 1925 – 8 March 2026) was a Palestinian historian who wrote extensively on the Palestinian exodus. He co-founded the Institute for Palestine Studies (IPS) in Beirut in December 1963 as an independent research and publishing center focusing on the Palestine problem and the Arab–Israeli conflict, and was its general secretary until 2016. Khalidi's first teaching post was at Oxford, a position he resigned from in 1956 in protest at the British invasion of Suez. He was Professor of Political Studies at the American University of Beirut until 1982 and thereafter a research fellow at the Harvard Center for International Affairs. He also taught at Princeton University.

Khalidi was a Fellow of the American Academy of Arts and Sciences. Described by the IPS as "the historian of the Palestinian cause" and the first to reveal Plan Dalet, he was influential in scholarship, institutional development, and diplomacy. His academic work in particular, according to Rashid Khalidi, has played a key role in shaping both Palestinian and broader Arab reactions to the loss of Palestine, and in outlining ways for the former to ensure that they remain visible as a presence within the Middle East map.

== Life and career ==
Khalidi, one of five children, was born in Jerusalem on 16 July 1925. His father, Ahmad Samih Khalidi, was dean of the Arab College of Jerusalem, and hailed from a family with roots in pre-Crusader Palestine. His stepmother, Anbara Salam Khalidi (4 August 1897–May 1986), was a Lebanese feminist, translator, and author, who significantly contributed to the emancipation of Arab women. Khalidi's early tutor was the director of Education in Palestine, G. B. Farrell. His half-brothers are the historian Tarif Khalidi and biochemist Usama al-Khalidi.

Khalidi first received his education in Ramallah before attending St George's School in Jerusalem. He later graduated with a B.A. from the University of London in 1945, then studied at the University of Oxford, gaining an M.Litt. in 1951. He then taught at the Faculty of Oriental Studies at Oxford, until he resigned, after the trilateral British, French and Israeli assault on Egypt in 1956, to take up teaching at the American University of Beirut. In the 50s he wrote 2 essays on Abd al-Ghani al-Nabulsi, a Syrian Sufi scholar who had written on tolerance, and who practiced this in regard to Jews and Christians he encountered.

Under his guidance the Institute of Palestine Studies, established in 1963, produced a long series of monographs in English and Arabic and several important translations of Hebrew texts into Arabic: 'The History of the Haganah', David Ben-Gurion, and Shertok's diaries—texts that still await translation into English. He also produced ground-breaking work on the fall of Haifa and Deir Yassin. His best known works are Before Their Diaspora, a photographic essay on Palestinian society prior to 1948 and All That Remains, the encyclopedic collection of village histories which he edited. He became a senior research associate at the Institute of Middle Eastern Studies at Harvard in 1982. More broadly, his intellectual interests extend from modern European history to international relations, in strategic and military terms. In 1983, Khalidi later became an adviser of the Iraqi delegation to the United Nations and joined an Arab Summit delegation for the United Kingdom.

Khalidi was critical of the Palestinian involvement in the Lebanese Civil War, recalling an argument with Yasser Arafat in which he told the Palestinian leader that the PLO "had no business" taking sides in the conflict.

Khalidi died in Cambridge, Massachusetts, United States, on 8 March 2026, at the age of 100.

== Position on the Palestine question ==
Khalidi's stated position on the Palestine question was for a two-state solution. Khalidi wrote in Foreign Affairs in 1988: "A Palestinian state in the occupied territories within the 1967 frontiers in peaceful coexistence alongside Israel is the only conceptual candidate for a historical compromise of this century-old conflict. Without it the conflict will remain an open-ended one."

Khalidi was a Palestinian representative to the Joint Palestinian–Jordanian delegation to the Middle East peace talks launched at the Madrid Conference, prior to the Oslo Agreements. He held no office in the Palestine Liberation Organization (PLO) or any of its bodies.

== Awards ==
At the Palestinian Heritage Foundation's 15th Anniversary banquet, Khalidi was presented with an award for his commitment to the Palestinian cause, the Arab-American community, and the Arab nation.

== Reviews ==
Moshe Brawer, professor of geography at Tel Aviv University wrote that Khalidi's encyclopedic work All that Remains suffers from "inadequate field research". Brawer criticized Khalidi's over-reliance on a modified version of the Village Statistics, which Khalidi acknowledged provide only rough estimates, while not making use of other sources such as the Village Files or RAF aerial photographs which would have yielded more accurate estimates.

Ann M. Lesch of Villanova University wrote that "As scholarly documentation, All That Remains will become the definitive source for research into the Palestinian displacement in 1948."

== Published works ==
=== Books ===
- (1974) Palestine and the Arab-Israeli Conflict: An Annotated Bibliography. Institute for Palestine Studies.
- (1987) From Haven to Conquest: Readings in Zionism and the Palestine Problem Until 1948. Institute for Palestine Studies. 1987 [Original in 1971]. ISBN 978-0-88728-155-6.
- (1983) Conflict and Violence in Lebanon: Confrontation in the Middle East. Harvard University Press. ISBN 0-674-16075-4
- (1984) Before Their Diaspora: A Photographic History of the Palestinians, 1876–1948. Institute for Palestine Studies. ISBN 0-88728-144-3
- (1987) From Haven to Conquest: Readings in Zionism and the Palestine Problem until 1948.. Institute of Palestine Studies, Washington DC.
- (1989) At a Critical Juncture: The United States and the Palestinian People. Center for Contemporary Arab Studies, Georgetown University.
- (1992) All That Remains: The Palestinian Villages Occupied and Depopulated by Israel in 1948. Institute for Palestine Studies. ISBN 0-88728-224-5
- (1992) Palestine Reborn. I. B. Tauris. ISBN 1-85043-563-4
- (1996) Islam, the West and Jerusalem. Center for Contemporary Arab Studies & Center for Muslim–Christian Understanding, Georgetown University.
- (1998) Khamsuna 'aman a'la taqsim Filastin خمسون عاما على تقسيم فلسطين، ٧٤٩١-٧٩٩١ [Fifty years since the Partition of Palestine (1947–1997)] (in Arabic). Beirut: Dar al-Nahar. OCLC 39908853.
- (1999) Dayr Yasin: al-Jum'a, 9 April 1948 دير ياسين : الجمعة، ٩ نيسان/أبريل ٨٤٩١ [Dayr Yasin: Friday, 9 April 1948] (in Arabic). Beirut: Institute for Palestine Studies. OCLC 43527890.
- (2000) The Ownership of the U.S. Embassy Site in Jerusalem. Institute for Palestine Studies. ISBN 0-88728-277-6

=== Articles ===
- (1959) "Why Did the Palestinians Leave?". Middle East Forum. 24: 21–24. July 1959.. Reprinted as "Why Did the Palestinians Leave, Revisited" (PDF). Journal of Palestine Studies. 134 (2): 42–54. Winter 2005.
- (1959) "The Fall of Haifa". Middle East Forum. 35: 22–32. December 1959.
- (1961) Plan Dalet: The Zionist Master Plan for the Conquest of Palestine. jstor, Middle East Forum, 37(9), 22–28, (November 1961).
- (1978) Khalidi, Walid (July 1978). "Thinking the unthinkable: A sovereign Palestinian State". Foreign Affairs. 56 (4): 695–713. doi:10.2307/20039986. JSTOR 20039986.
- (1981) "Regiopolitics: Toward a U.S. Policy on the Palestine Problem". Foreign Affairs. 59. Summer 1981.
- (1985) Khalidi, Walid (Summer 1985). "A Palestinian Perspective on the Arab–Israeli Conflict". Journal of Palestine Studies. 14 (4): 35–48. doi:10.2307/2537120. JSTOR 2537120.
- (1988) Khalidi, Walid (Spring 1988). "Toward Peace in the Holy Land". Foreign Affairs. 66 (4). doi:10.2307/20043482. JSTOR 20043482.
- (1991) Khalidi, Walid (Winter 1991). "The Gulf Crisis: Origins and Consequences". Journal of Palestine Studies. 20 (2): 5–28. doi:10.2307/2537195. JSTOR 2537195.
- (1993) Khalidi, Walid (Spring 1993). "Benny Morris and Before Their Diaspora". Journal of Palestine Studies. 22 (3): 106–119. doi:10.2307/2537574. JSTOR 2537574.
- (1993) Khalidi, Walid (Winter 1993). "The Jewish-Ottoman Land Company: Herzl's Blueprint for the Colonization of Palestine". Journal of Palestine Studies. 22 (2): 30–47. doi:10.2307/2537267. JSTOR 2537267.
- (1996) Khalidi, Walid (Autumn 1997). "Revisiting the UNGA Partition Resolution". Journal of Palestine Studies. 27 (1): 5–21. doi:10.2307/2537806. JSTOR 2537806.
- (1998) Khalidi, Walid (Spring 1998). "Selected Documents on the 1948 Palestine War". Journal of Palestine Studies. 27 (3): 60–105. doi:10.2307/2537835. JSTOR 2537835.
- (2005) "On Albert Hourani, the Arab Office, and the Anglo-American Committee of Inquiry 1946". Journal of Palestine Studies. 35 (1): 60–79. Autumn 2005. doi:10.1525/jps.2005.35.1.60.
- (2014) "Palestine and Palestine Studies: One Century after World War I and the Balfour Declaration." Center of Palestine Studies, SOAS, University of London First Annual Lecture, 6 March 2014

== See also ==
- Depopulated Palestinian locations in Israel

== Sources ==
- Hirsch, Moshe and Housen-Couriel, Deborah (1995). Whither Jerusalem?: Proposals and Positions Concerning the Future of Jerusalem. Martinus Nijhoff Publishers. ISBN 90-411-0077-6
