= Shmuel Erlich =

Israeli psychoanalyst (born 1937)

- שמואל ארליך
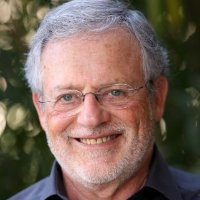
- Shmuel Erlich in 2012
- Born: 11 July 1937 (age 88); Frankfurt, Germany
- Occupation: Psychoanalyst
- Website: http://pluto.huji.ac.il/~mserlich/

H. Shmuel Erlich (Hebrew: שמואל ארליך; born July 11, 1937, in Frankfurt) is an Israeli psychoanalyst, organizational consultant and psychologist of clinical psychology. Since 1990 he has been professor of the Sigmund Freud Chair at the Hebrew University of Jerusalem. In 2005 he became emeritus. Erlich is one of the spiritual fathers of the Nazareth-Conferences.

== Education and career ==
Almost two years after Shmuel Erlich's birth, at the end of 1938, his parents left Nazi Germany because of the political developments and the growing threat to the German-Jewish family, and went to Palestine with their son. They arrived there at the beginning of 1939. Shmuel Erlich grew up in Tel Aviv. From 1954 to 1971 he lived in the United States where he completed his psychological training. After his return to Israel he has been residing in Jerusalem. He speaks German, English and Hebrew.

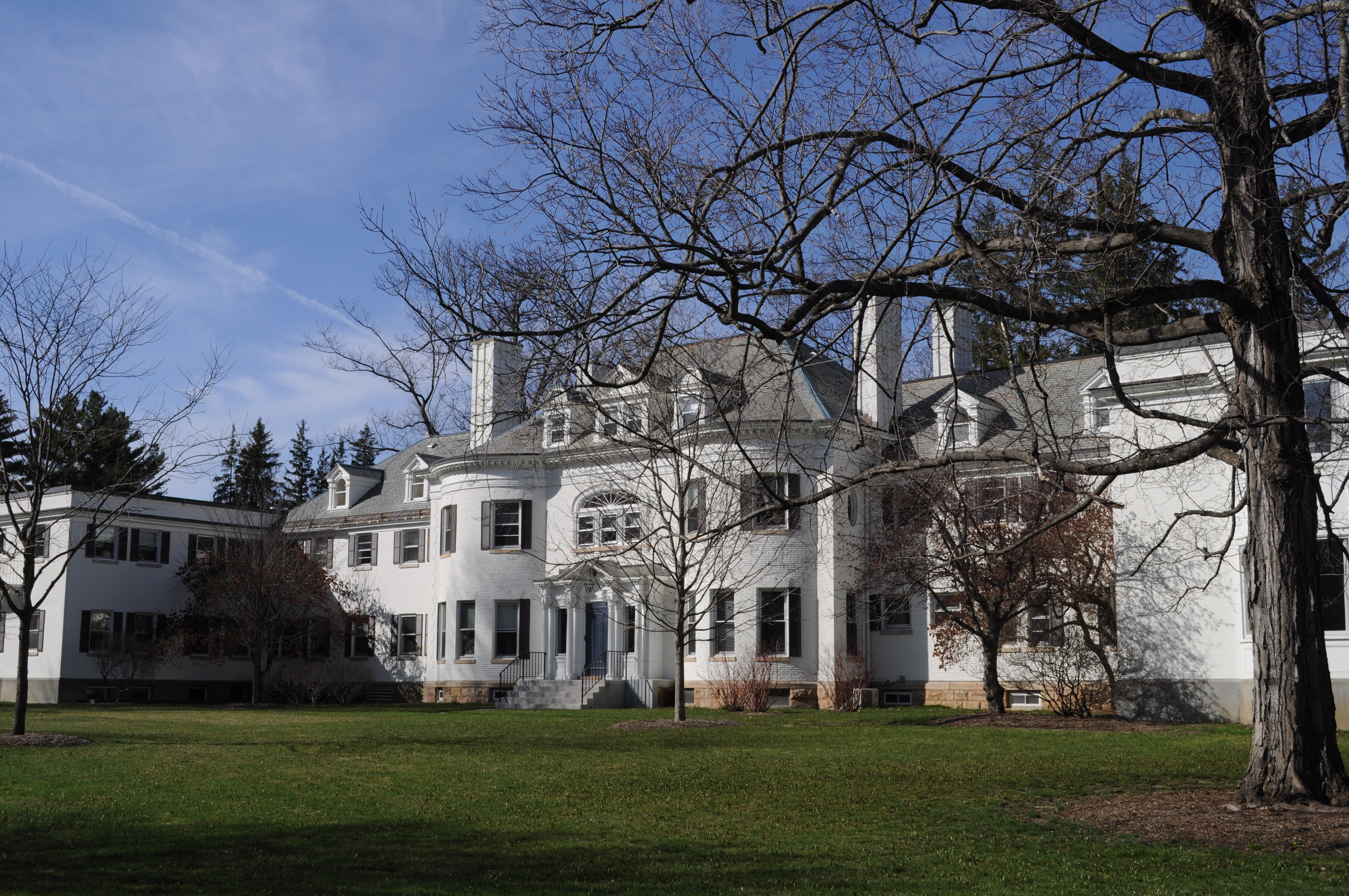
Austen Riggs Center

Shmuel Erlich studied psychology at the City College of New York (CCNY) where he graduated in 1959 with a Bachelor's degree. In 1965 he received his doctorate in clinical psychology at New York University (NYU). From 1965 to 1967 he was granted a post-graduate scholarship from the National Institute of Mental Health (NIMH) which made it possible for him to do research in clinical psychology at the Austen Riggs Center in Stockbridge, Massachusetts. Already certified as a clinical psychologist, he received another certificate in 1971 in which the American Board of Professional Psychology (ABPP) elected him as the best in his profession. That same year he was certified by the Israel Psychological Association as a Supervisor for Psychotherapy and Psychodiagnostics. In 1972 he became lecturer in clinical psychology at the Hebrew University of Jerusalem. In 1983 he completed his training as psychoanalyst at the Israeli Institute of Psychoanalysis, initially receiving the basic membership in the Israel Psychoanalytic Society (IPS) and in 1985 the so-called full membership. (Note: That time there were two different types of membership for new members in the IPS.) Since 1987 he has been a training analyst. In 1985 he was a founding member of OFEK, the Israeli Association for the Study of Groups and Organizational Processes. After Eric Miller had led the first two conferences of OFEK, Erlich became director of the following four. From 1993 to 1997 he was Chairman of the Education Committee of the Psychoanalytic Institute and of the Professional Society in Israel. From 1999 to 2002 he was President of IPS.

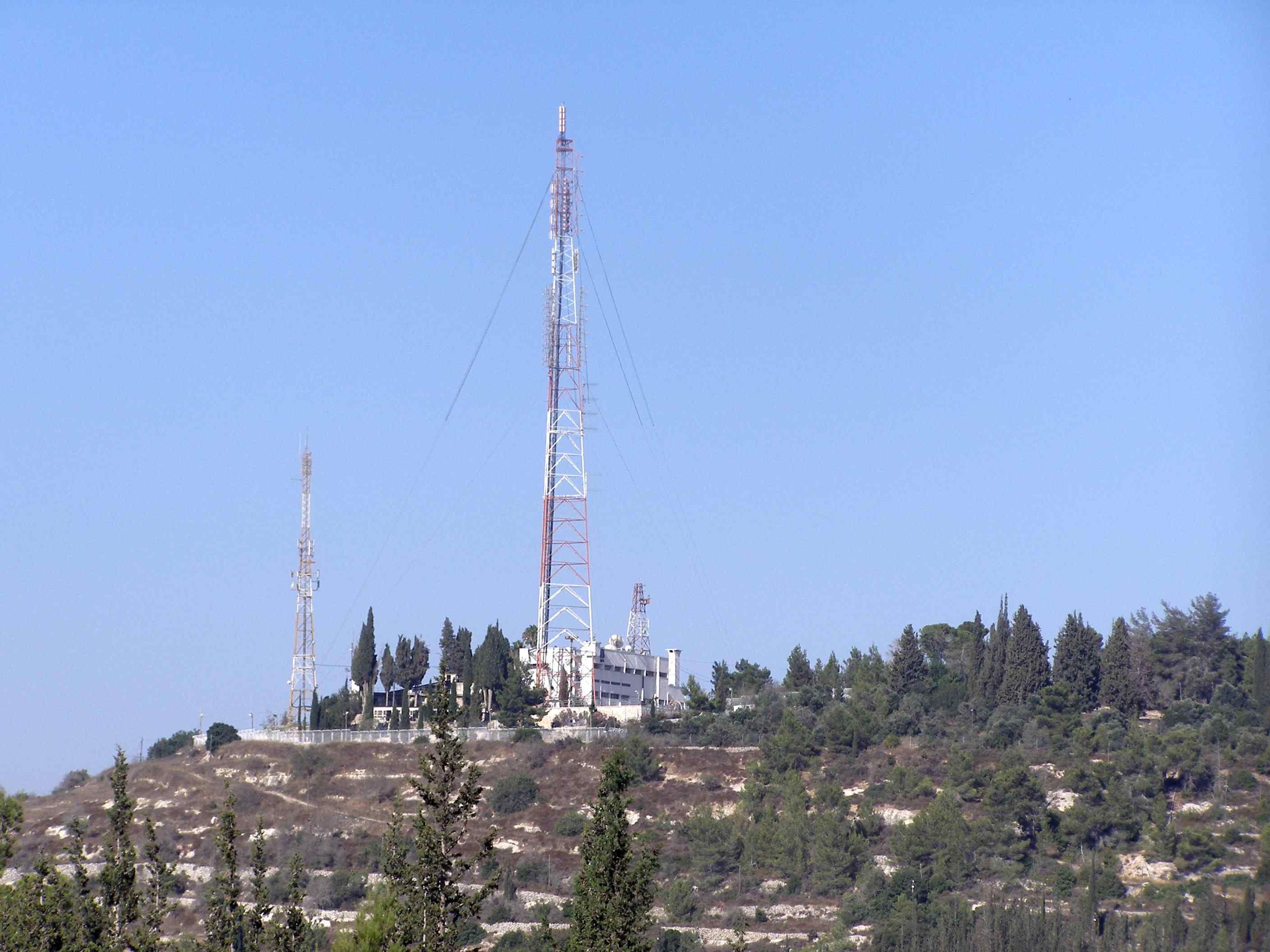
Psychiatric Hospital Eitanim

In 2000 Shmuel Erlich took over the chairmanship of a working group in the European Psychoanalytical Federation (EPF), a position he held until 2006. This working group focuses on the relationship between psychoanalytic knowledge of the inner experience and its connection to the exterior reality. In 2003 the International Psychoanalytical Association (IPA) nominated him as the regional representative for Europe of the newly constituted Board of Representatives, a position he held until 2015. (Note: with an interruption between 2007 and 2011) From 2005 to 2011 he was chairman of the Education Committee in the IPA. In 2010 he wrote the "Letter from Jerusalem" for the International Journal of Psychoanalysis as part of an initiative of the journal with which various psychoanalytic societies could introduce themselves to the international professional audience. As a co-founder of the Nazareth-Conferences he has been part of the so-called staff since 1994, a position he maintained in subsequent conferences under the auspices of Partners in Confronting Collective Atrocities (PCCA). In 2012 Erlich was Director of the first European Conference of the PCCA which took place at Kliczków Castle in Poland with the title European Perpetrators and Victims - Then and Now. The second European Conference took place in 2014 and a third one in 2016.

In addition to his academic career Shmuel Erlich has been a senior psychologist at the Psychiatric Hospital Eitanim near Jerusalem. There he has set up a ward for young people which he has led for 15 years.

== Work and research ==
The focus of Shmuel Erlich's scientific interest and work is psychoanalytic theory and its applications, including psychotherapy and the exploration of identity. Specifically, it deals with the impact of external trauma – particularly in connection with terrorist attacks – as well as with research of organizational processes.

=== Organizational consultations ===
With his organizational consultations Shmuel Erlich wants to contribute to a deeper understanding that organizations have of themselves, their structures and power relationships, allowing them to become aware of the role of possible corruption and regressive processes. According to Erlich, this awareness could lead to changes of all of these phenomena. He believes that this is true for any organization, including psychoanalytic training institutes, as well as German institutes, which call him occasionally, as a supervisor or as lecturer.

=== Groups in conflict ===
Shmuel Erlich directs special attention to conflicts in which members of different national groups are entangled with each other. (Note: for instance Germans and Israelis or Israelis and Palestiniens) In order to explore these conflicts, he uses the method of the so-called Group Relations Conferences. They are based on the model of the so-called Leicester Conferences which were developed at the Tavistock Institute in London. The aim of such conferences is to help participants develop the ability to take on responsibility of various social roles. To this goal Erlich still feels committed, organizing conferences for different groups in conflict or being involved in their organization.

According to Shmuel Erlich, these Group Relation Conferences are intended to close the gap which usually exists between the view of one's own inner world – experiences, fantasies, and the like – and the outer world of reality. To achieve this goal, a psychoanalytic and a social systems theory approach are combined. Through these conferences a place for conscious experience of a previously perceived role and the possible development of a new one is created. The aim here is to understand hostility as something that originates not only through the experience of external reality, but is also constructed by the inner reality. With his method Erlich wants to encourage people to think rationally in emotionally-charged situations in order to gain a deeper understanding of how social and political events influence one's mind and soul. Edward R. Shapiro evaluates Erlich's efforts in his review:

When we look at the world around us, we can become really frightened. But our fears come from our minds, our bodies, and our developmental histories. So how do we know when we are afraid that we are accurately grasping reality? H. Shmuel Erlich’s brilliant effort to link what is in our minds with our outer world perceptions opens the possibility of a more complex engagement in our lives. Using the tools of psychoanalysis and social systems theory, he brings us from the intimacies of the consulting room to the Gulf War, the paranoid organization, the mind of the terrorist, the corrupt social system. He illuminates the fluid boundaries between external and internal reality. How do we move from the experience of an enemy we must destroy to one we believe we might talk with? How does the commitment to something larger than the self contribute to the creation of terrorists? These are not trivial questions. This fascinating book is relevant to all those who take the risk of living fully in our chaotic social world.

— Edward R. Shapiro,

=== Psychoanalysis ===
In his psychoanalytic work Shmuel Erlich was initially dedicated to the study of the mental and emotional experience of young people and later researched in detail how experiences are processed.

==== Youth ====
After he had created the ward for young people at the Psychiatric Hospital Eitanim, Shmuel Erlich remained there for fifteen years. This gave him opportunities to study the quality of experiences of young people and adolescents. For example, the “Role of Denial in Adolescence” interested him. He suggested “to consider the development crisis of adolescence through the use of denial”.

In order to endure and master the often extremely divergent feelings of strength, weakness and dependence and the simultaneously felt intensive regression needs, the adolescent uses the defense mechanism of denial, which can lead to splitting. A case study demonstrates an example of how this behavior of defense mechanism can promote or interfere with further psychological development.

— Psychosozial-Verlag, Psyche 1990

In his psychoanalytic work Shmuel Erlich was not only interested in individual cases, but also how they are embedded in their environment and political reality. This is demonstrated in a case study which describes the reactions of young people to the assassination of former Israeli Prime Minister Yitzhak Rabin.

==== Processing of experiences ====
Shmuel Erlich's scientific interest was directed early on to the question of how people process their inner mental and emotional experiences. He describes in detail what he means by such an experience. It is constituted by the perception of external and internal realities, as well as by the conscious and the unconscious and it is then mentally organized. Erlich views the data of the external reality, which people absorb with their senses, at one pole, and the structured experience of their inner world at the other pole. In between the poles he describes a consolidation process. This process is both innate and “socially constructed”. Through this process, Erlich says, sensations are continuously “absorbed, digested, assimilated, and structured.” This process, which is described by Erlich as “Experience Modalities”, largely eludes conscious awareness and voluntary control. The process has a major influence on the way in which people view themselves and also how they organize their relationships with their fellow human beings and their environment. He describes two ways of relating that are very different from each other. They are similar to what Winnicott calls modes of “Being and Doing”. If people find themselves in “Doing Mode”, their opposite partner is seen as separate and independent, and the relationship is based on “cause and effect, dominated by purpose and aim, direct and chronological”. In contrast to the "Doing Mode" Erlich describes the mode of "Being" in which the boundaries between the self and the opposite partner fuse together. In the experience of the person who is in this mode, boundaries no longer exist. According to Erlich, this can lead to numerous conflicts in interpersonal relationships, and there can also be considerable difficulties in processing losses.

== Publications ==
- The Couch in the Marketplace: Psychoanalysis and Social Reality, London: Karnac, 2013, ISBN 978-1-78220-030-7
- A beam of darkness – understanding the terrorist mind, London: Karnac, 2010, pp. 3–15
- with Mira Erlich-Ginor, Hermann Beland (2009), Fed with Tears – Poisoned with Milk. The "Nazareth" Group-Relations-Conferences. Germans and Israelis – The Past in the Present. With a Foreword by Desmond M. Tutu, Gießen: Psychozial, ISBN 978-3-89806-751-5
- Persönliche Überlegungen zum Selbstbild und Identitätsgefühl der Deutschen (in German), vol. 61, Psyche, 2007, pp. 386–393
- Die schwierige Situation der in Deutschland lebenden Juden. Ein offener Brief (in German), vol. 53, Psyche, 1999, pp. 1188–1190
- with Blatt, Sidney J. (1990), Narzißmus und Objektliebe. Zur Metapsychologie des Erlebens (in German), vol. 44, Psyche, pp. 995–1018
- Verleugnung in der Adoleszenz. Einige widersprüchliche Aspekte (in German), vol. 44, Psyche, 1990, pp. 218–239

== Awards ==
- 1965: Founder's Day Award by New York University
- 1966: NY Award in „recognition for an outstanding dissertation in psychology of the year 1966“ by New York Society of Clinical Psychologists
- 2005: Sigourney Award for outstanding contributions to psychoanalysis
- 2016: Lifetime Achievement Award by Israeli Association for Psychotherapy
