= Crisis plan =

A crisis plan is a component of crisis management that involves the creation of a structured document—digital or physical—detailing the procedures and actions to be taken by an individual or organization in response to a crisis. The plan serves as a practical guide for managing emergency situations and mitigating potential harm.

Typical elements of a crisis plan may include maps of evacuation routes, personal wellness or recovery strategies, lists of emergency supplies, CPR instructions, or comprehensive organizational disaster contingency plans.

Crisis plans may be produced or stored in digital form, using formats such as PDF, or integrated into mobile apps for smartphones and other devices. They may also be distributed via USB keys or other portable storage media to ensure accessibility during emergencies.

Because each crisis presents unique circumstances, the content and structure of crisis plans vary depending on specific risks and needs.

Modern technology has facilitated crisis plan implementation through the development of mobile tools that enhance situational awareness and emergency response. Numerous applications exist for smartphones and other platforms that support crisis preparedness and communication. One example is the *CPR & Choking* app for iPhone and iPad, developed by the University of Washington and King County Emergency Medical Services (EMS).

== Personal crisis plan ==
One element of personal wellness and mental health includes the creation of a crisis plan. Development of a real crisis plan and post-crisis plan is key to the daily maintenance of the evidence-based practice of the Wellness Recovery Action Plan as referenced by the SAMHSA National Registry for Evidence-Based Programs and Practices.

Recovery from personal crisis or health crisis may be impeded by trauma, circumstance, or anxiety. An effective post-crisis plan can reduce exposure to personal risk, including the impact of substance abuse and addictions.

With respect to mental health recovery – families, service providers and others can help develop crisis plans that form an effective and enforceable legal document that can be used in times when a person is unwell.

=== Mental health 'crisis cards' ===
Those involved with mental health care have developed so-called 'crisis cards' which may be used in the event of a mental health crisis. These cards may be used to present to friends, health care workers, police or strangers should an emergency ever arise and an individual becomes unwell.

== Organizational crisis plan ==
One example of a component of an organizational crisis plan is the Material Safety Data Sheet, which provides guidance and standards for the handling of hazardous and unsafe materials. These documents are a key element of occupational safety and health.

"The concept of “crisis” has been defined in a dozen ways, but from a management perspective, a crisis must be seen as a turning point in an organization’s history. Crises are events that can cause death or injury; significant damage to the environment; massive interruptions to operations; significant financial reversals; or long-term or permanent reputational damage."

— Larry Kamer, Kamer Consulting Group

== Disclosing crisis online ==
There are many complicated elements concerning privacy when discussing the disclosure of personal information online. This is only made more so during times a person is pushed into crisis. Given the nature and confusion of those in a crisis state, developing and maintaining a crisis plan that includes provisions dealing with online privacy is crucial.

== See also ==
- Emergency
- Disaster
- Health crisis
