= Dayr Amr =

Dayr 'Amr دير عمرو
- Village
- Etymology: Khurbet Deir 'Amr (transl. the ruin of the monastery of Amr)
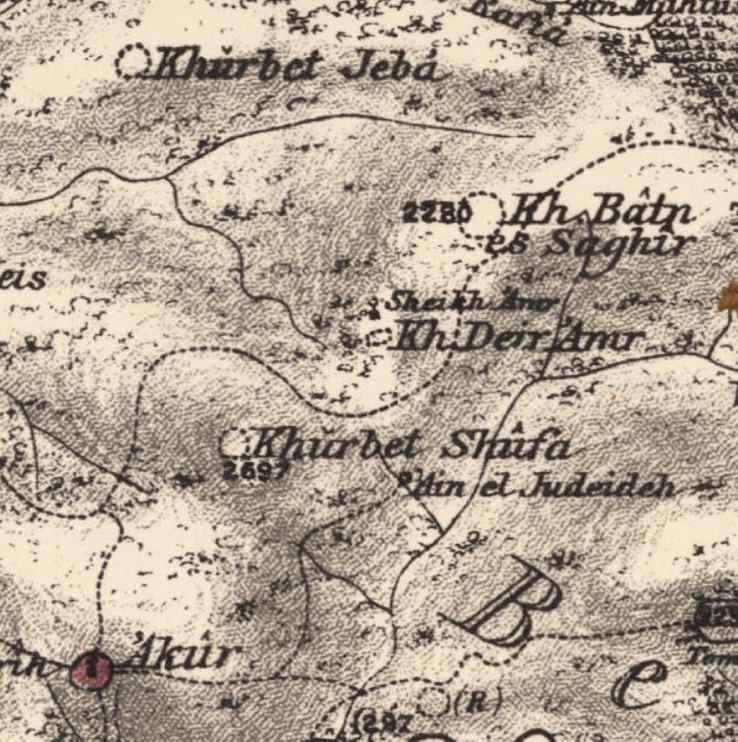
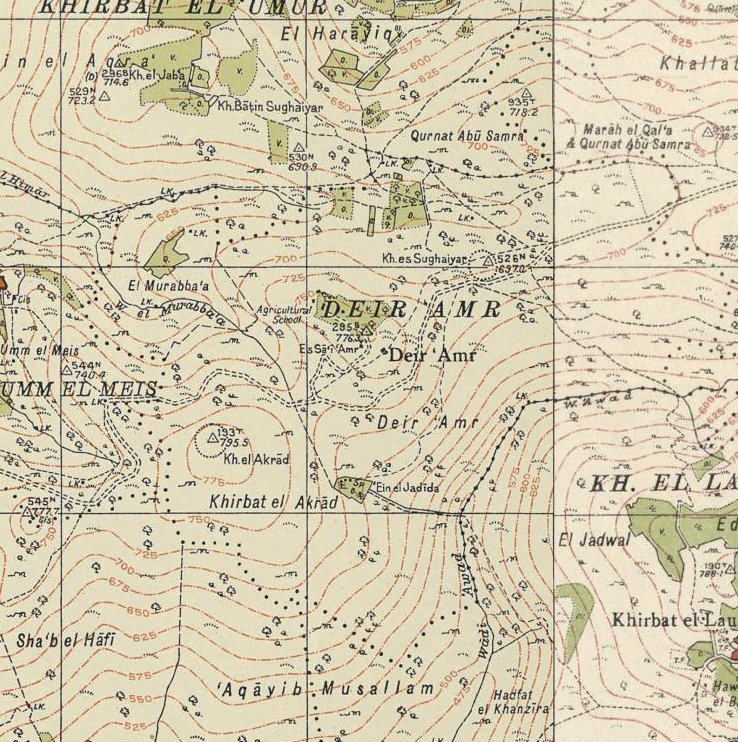
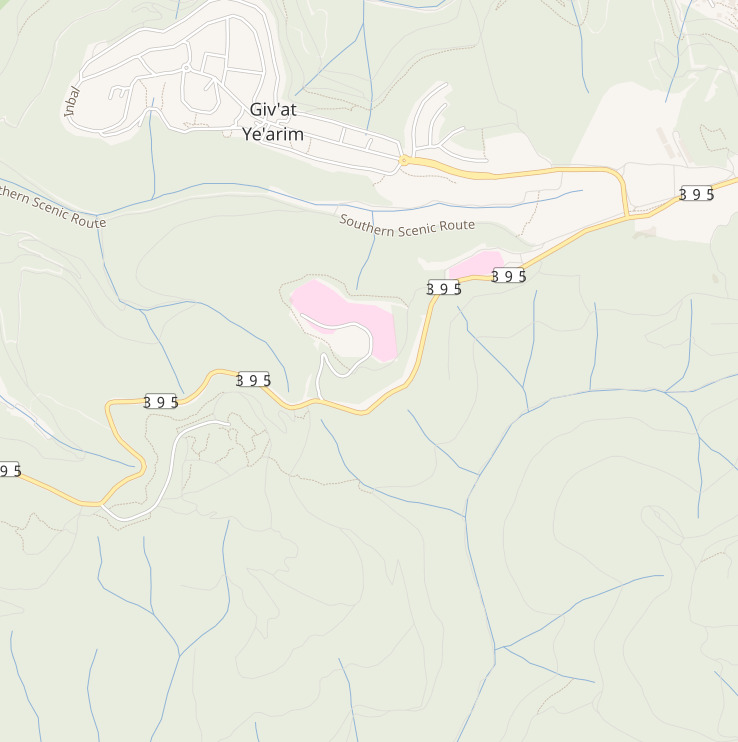
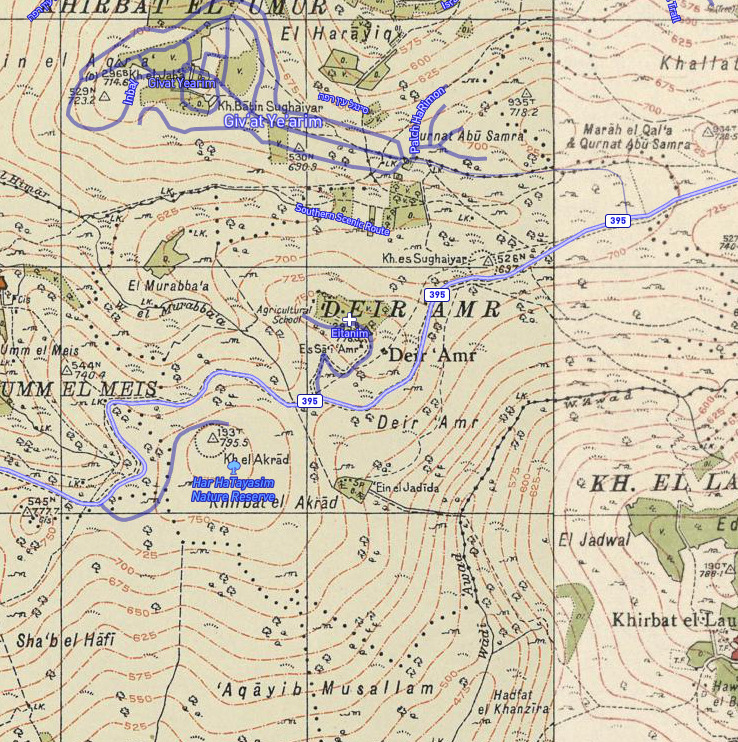
- 1870s map 1940s map modern map 1940s with modern overlay map A series of historical maps of the area around Dayr Amr (click the buttons)

- Location within Mandatory Palestine
- Coordinates: 31°46′37″N 35°05′48″E
- Palestine grid: 159/131
- Geopolitical entity: Mandatory Palestine
- Subdistrict: Jerusalem
- Date of depopulation: July 17, 1948

Area
  - Total: 3,072 dunams (3.072 km^{2}; 1.186 sq mi)

Population (1945)
  - Total: 10
- Current Localities: Eitanim

Dayr 'Amr was a Palestinian Arab village in the Jerusalem Subdistrict. It was depopulated during the 1948 Arab-Israeli War on July 17, 1948, by the Fourth Battalion of the Har'el Brigade, during the second stage of Operation Dan. It was located 12.5 km west of Jerusalem. Dayr 'Amr was named after a local sage known by al-Sa'i 'Amr and a shrine was in the village dedicated to him.

== History ==
In 1863, Victor Guérin found here a wali, devoted to a Sheikh Amer, and this wali gave name to the neighbouring "ruin", which he described as "twenty small chambers, half of which have been collapsed and enclosed within the same enclosure: they were constructed with materials of all kinds and date from the Middle Ages." He also noted five cisterns had been excavated from the rock, and appeared to be older.

In 1883, the PEF's Survey of Western Palestine found "ruined walls" at Khurbet Deir 'Amr.

=== British Mandate era ===
In the 1922 census of Palestine, conducted by the British Mandate authorities, Dair Amr had a population of 5, all Muslims, while in the 1931 census, it was counted with Suba, and together they had a population of 434 Muslims, in 110 houses.

Freya Stark recalled how she met with Ahmad Samih Khalidi, the principal of Arab College (Jerusalem), and "his charming Syrian wife" and inspected the orphanage which was built at Dayr 'Amr. The first £ 1,000 was collected among fourteen Arabs of Jerusalem, who started it in 1940. They built a school, a farm, and a directors house in "strong stone" at the top of a stony hill. The student learned agriculture, which they could use when they returned to their villages.

In the 1945 statistics only 10 Muslims were recorded, with a total of 3,072 dunums of land. Of this, 18 dunams were for irrigable land or plantations, 650 for cereals, while 2,404 dunams were non-cultivable land.

=== 1948, aftermath ===
In 1952, the buildings of the boys' farm were transformed into the Israeli mental hospital Eitanim.

In 1992, the place was described in the following terms: "The site is surrounded with a fence and a guarded gate. All the houses still stand and new extensions have been added to some of them. Large cypress and carob trees grow among the houses. There is an olive grove on the southern edge of the village. The Bezek telephone and television company has established a large facility, with radar equipment, at the southern edge of the site. The psychiatric hospital of Eytanim is nearby."

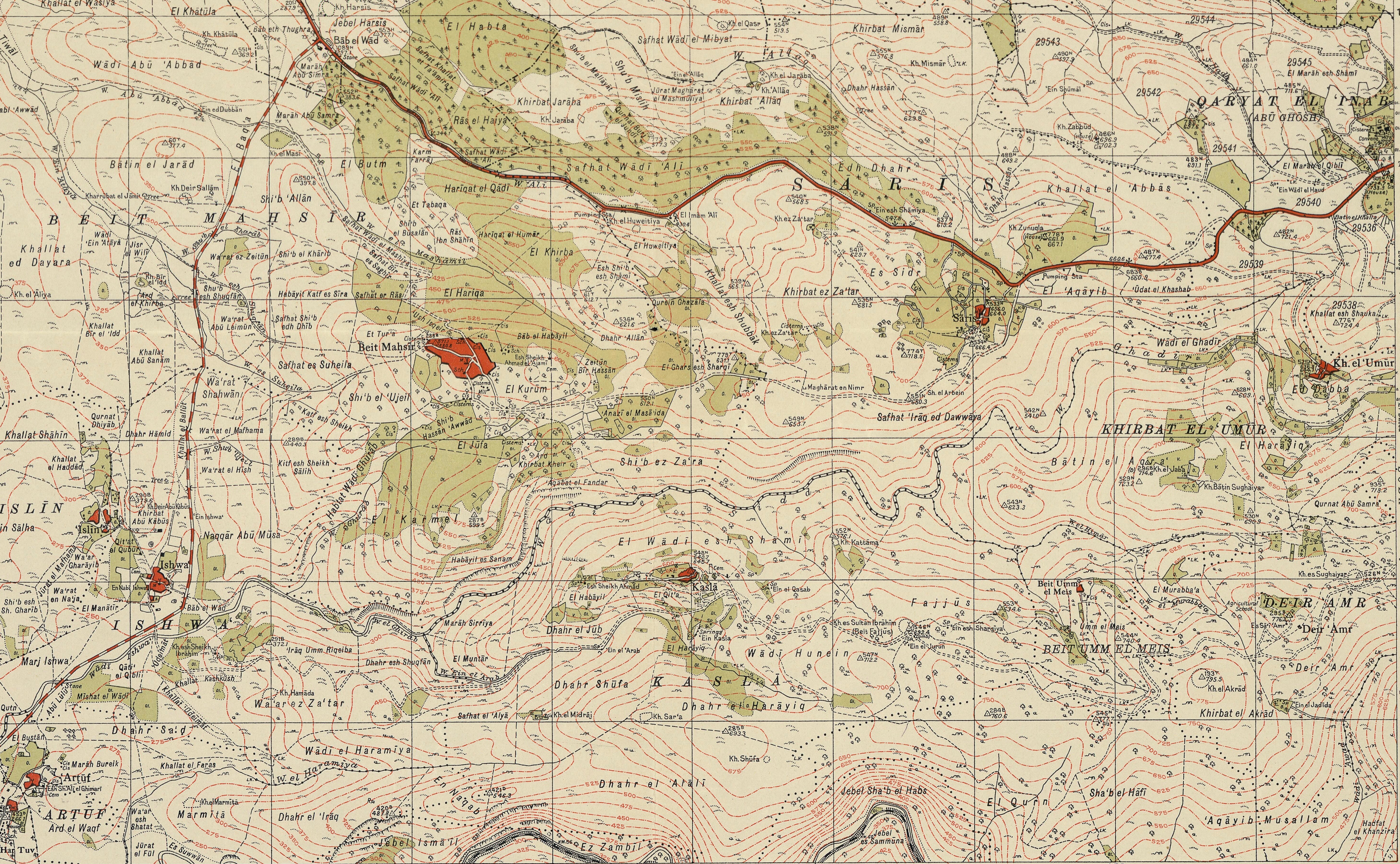
Dayr 'Amr 1943 1:20,000 (bottom left)

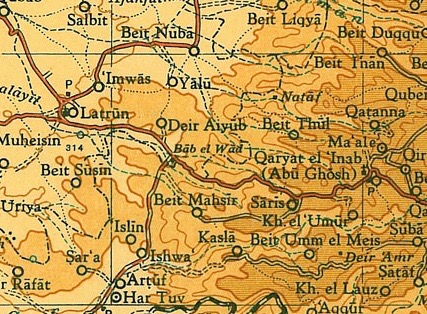
Dayr 'Amr 1945 1:250,000

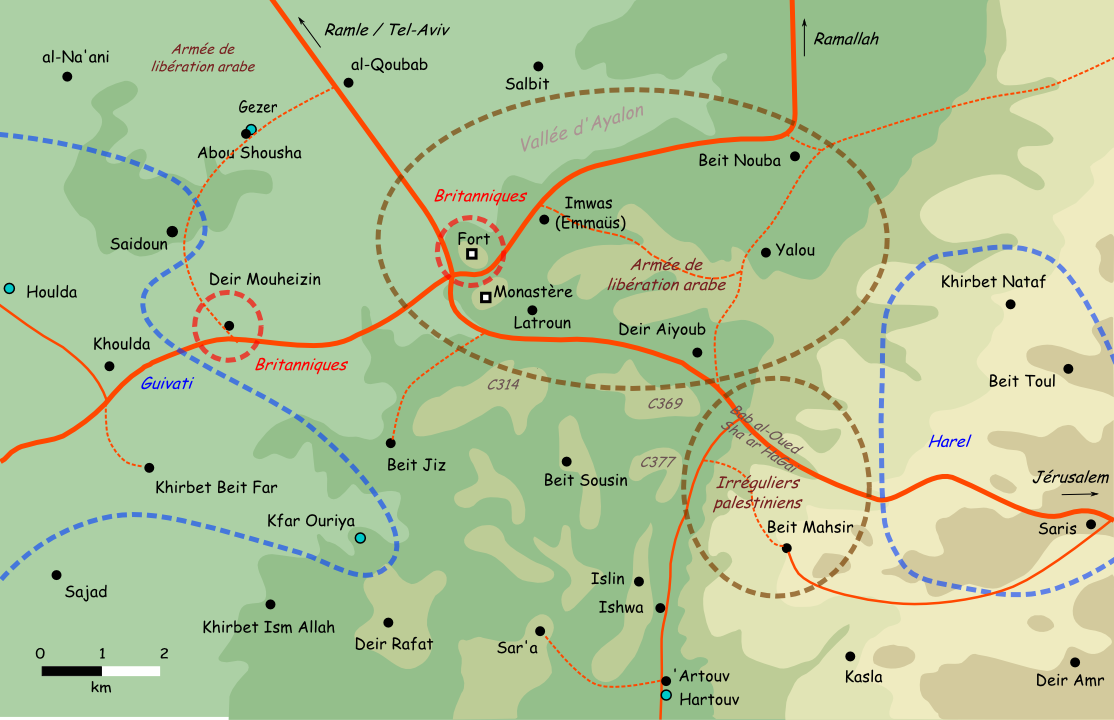
Dayr 'Amr May 10 1948

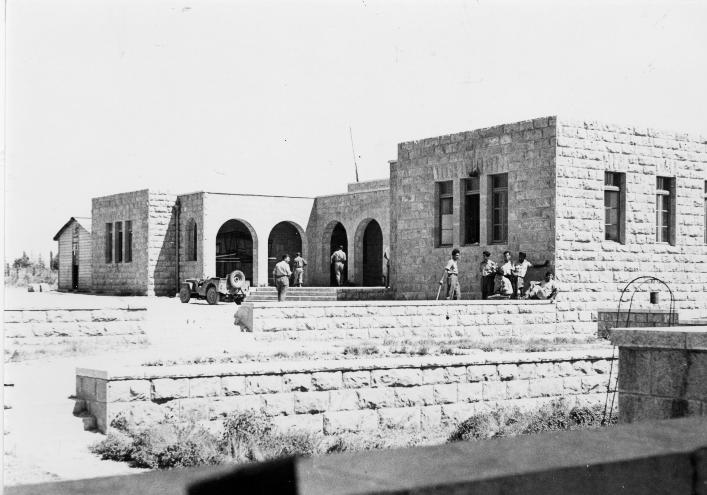
Deir 'Amr orphanage after capture, 1948

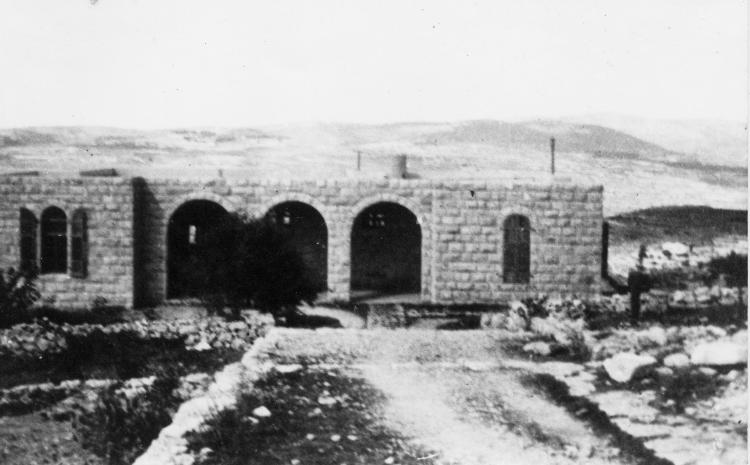
Deir 'Amr orphanage July 1948

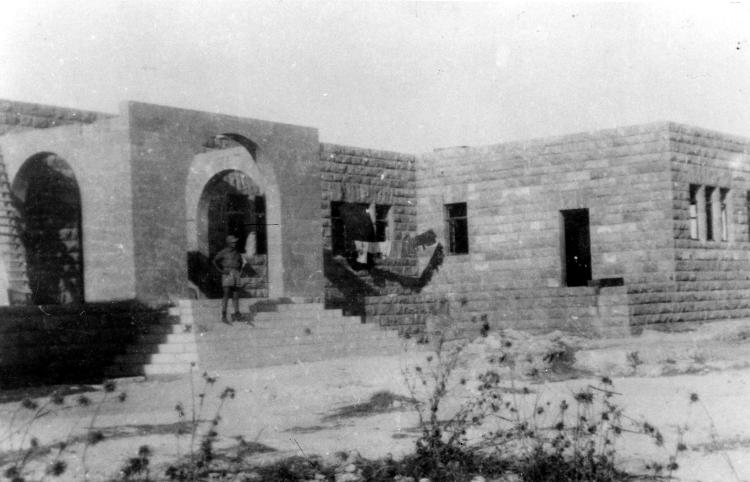
Deir 'Amr orphanage occupied by the Harel Brigade

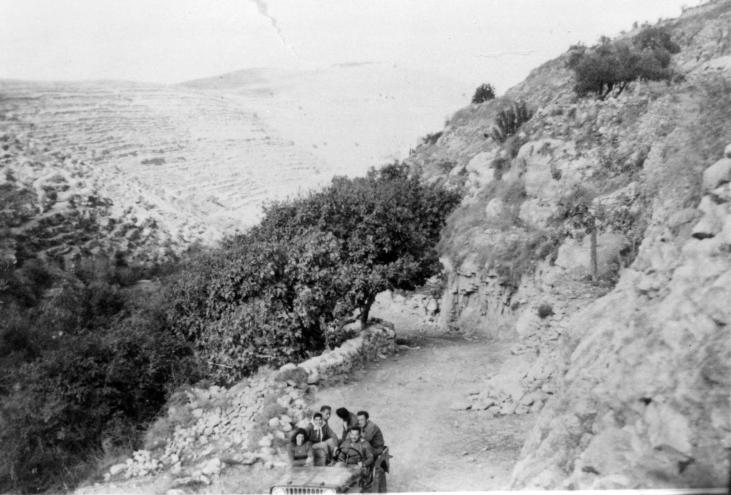
Road to Deir 'Amr, July 1948

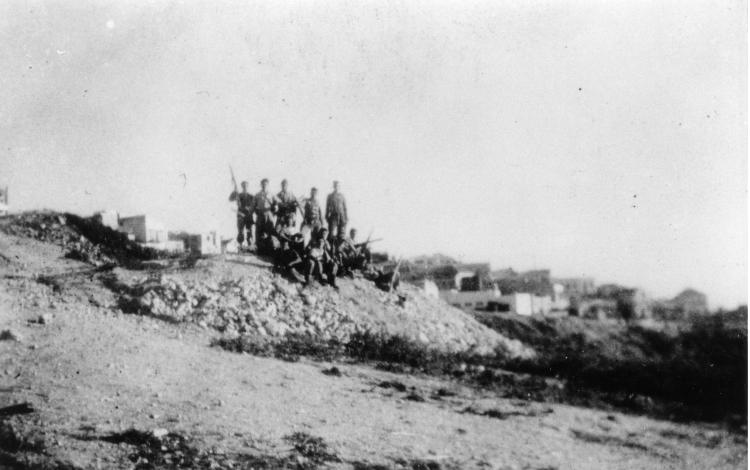
Members of Yiftach Brigade outside Dayr 'Amr. 1948
