= Eitanim =

Eitanim: אֵיתָנִים (Hebrew); إيتانيم (Arabic)
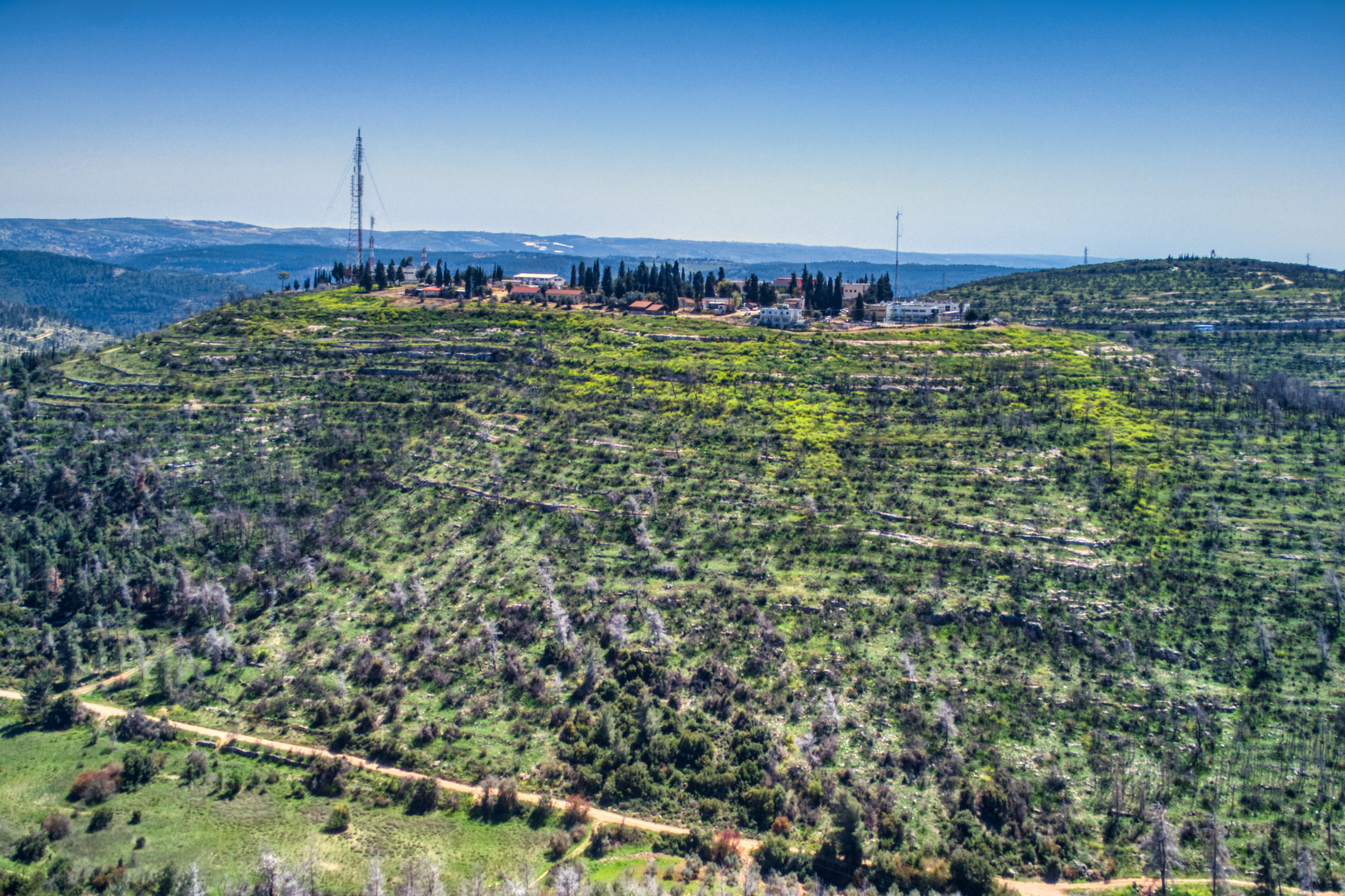

- Location within Jerusalem District Location within Israel
- Coordinates: 31°46′44″N 35°5′43″E
- Country: Israel
- District: Jerusalem
- Council: Mateh Yehuda
- Founded: 1950
- Population (2024): 54

Eitanim (Hebrew: אֵיתָנִים, lit. '"steadfast"') is a psychiatric hospital in central Israel. Located near Jerusalem, it falls under the jurisdiction of Mateh Yehuda Regional Council. In 2024 it had a population of 54.

== Etymology ==
The name of the village is from a verse in the Bible, prophet Micah 6:2: "Listen, you enduring foundations of the earth".

== History ==
Until 1948, there was a village in the area by the name of Dayr 'Amr. In 1942 an agricultural school was established there for Arab orphans of the 1936–1939 Arab revolt in Palestine. In 1950 a hospital for people with tuberculosis was founded on the site.

Today Eitanim is a psychiatric hospital that specializes in acute emergency cases. It operates as a branch of Kfar Shaul and the Jerusalem Mental Health Center. The compound has separate facilities for men and women. Eitanim is the only psychiatric hospital in Israel with an entire ward dedicated to the treatment of severe autism in adults.

== Broadcasting station ==
On Etamin, there is also a broadcasting station with multiple towers. The tallest of them is 110 metres (360 ft) tall and additionally guyed. It is among other used for broadcasting the following radio programmes in the FM-range.

Frequency	Polarisation	Station	Power
87.6 MHz	v	KAN 88	40 kW
88.8 MHz	v	MaKan	40 kW
91.3 MHz	v	KAN Kol HaMusika	40 kW
91.8 MHz	v	Galgalatz	40 kW
92.5 MHz	v	KAN Reshet Moreshet	40 kW
93 MHz	v	Radio Kol Chai MHz	3.2 kW
95.5 MHz	v	KAN Bet	40 kW
96.6 MHz	v	Galei Zahal (Galatz)	40 kW
97.8 MHz	v	KAN Gimmel	40 kW
100.3 MHz	v	KAN Reka	5 kW
105.1 MHz	v	KAN Tarbut	40 kW

== See also ==
- Health care in Israel
