= Nazareth-Conferences =

Beginning of a project of psychoanalysts from England, Israel and Germany

The Nazareth-Conferences were the beginning of a project of psychoanalysts from England, Israel and Germany, whose founding fathers and mothers intended to contribute to a process of solving conflicts that developed between national groups. The causes of these conflicts were supposed in collective prejudices and resentments. The aim of the conferences was – and still is for the follow-up projects – to become aware of these prejudices and resentments and – at best – to give them up. Desmond Tutu compared the conferences in his foreword for the English and German edition of the book about the Nazareth-Conferences with the Truth and reconciliation commission set up after the end of Apartheid in South Africa.

== History ==
There are long paths that individual psychoanalysts and their representative organizations – joined in the International Psychoanalytical Association (IPA) – had to go until the first of the three conferences under the name Nazareth-Conferences could be held in 1994. The roots go back to the year 1934 when Max Eitingon after his flight from Germany founded the Palestinian, today Israel Psychoanalytic Society. From their ranks came some of the founders of these conferences.

A second line of the story of the project began 1957 in England. There the Tavistock Institute started to develop the later so-called Leicesterconferences, an “empirical experiment on group relations” – partly with psychoanalytic concepts, partly with those of the “theory of open systems”.

1977 the congress of the IPA for the first time after the war and the period of Nazism was held in Jerusalem. The occurrences at the congress activated in Germany and Israel processes of reflection and discussion that in 1985 should have visible consequences in both countries. In Jerusalem 1977 the German group suffered a grievous experienced rejection of their desire, to hold a next congress in Berlin – also for the first time after the Holocaust –, but made use of this offense for an intensive process of self-reflection. At its beginning there was the insight in the “illusion of an innocent tradition and history”. The result was presented at the 34th congress of the IPA 1985 in Hamburg in an accompanying exhibition that traced the self-reflective process.

In the same year in Israel OFEK was founded as a result of striving for self-knowledge after the Jerusalem congress: an organization dedicated to the study of group processes using the Leicesterconferences. With support and under the direction of Eric Miller from the Tavistock Institute in London own group relation conferences were established with the OFEK in Israel.

Soon after the IPA-Congress 1985 in Hamburg and stimulated by it, Rafael Moses and his wife Rina Moses Hrushevski in Israel suggested a research group that should initiate reflexive processes of both groups in the presence of each other. The decision to enter into this venture and to start the project fell in the apartment of the couple Moses as Shmuel Erlich, who was there at the time, mentioned. But a further 9 years – and the failure of a first attempt – went by before the first conference in 1994 finally was held in Nazareth.

As some participants painfully were missing the German Jews on the first and second conference, Shmuel Erlich as a native Frankfurter turned to them in an open letter 1999, shortly before the third conference, encouraging them to participate.

The long way of the German psychoanalysts in these conferences were according to Hermann Beland on one hand caused by the “still collectively effective” defence of the Germans against a visualization of the Holocaust and on the other hand the lack of “convincing insight into the insanity, into why the Germans wanted this” (the Holocaust, author's note). In detail he described the delusions and confusions – his own and of part of the German group –, which finally led to an involvement in this project. Since 1922 it took a long time until 2007 that a congress of the IPA in Berlin was possible again.

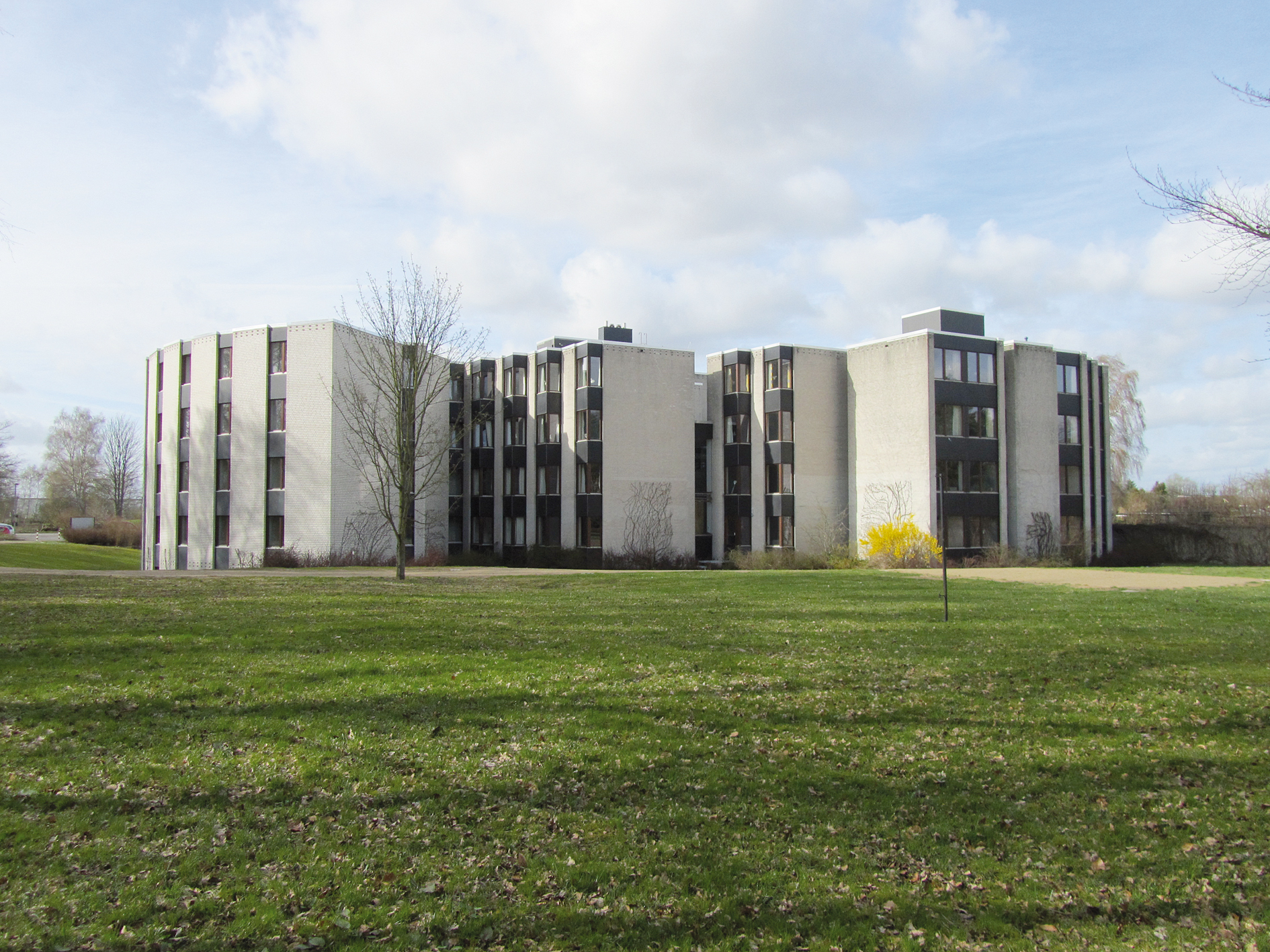
Conference site 2000 in Bad Segeberg/Germany

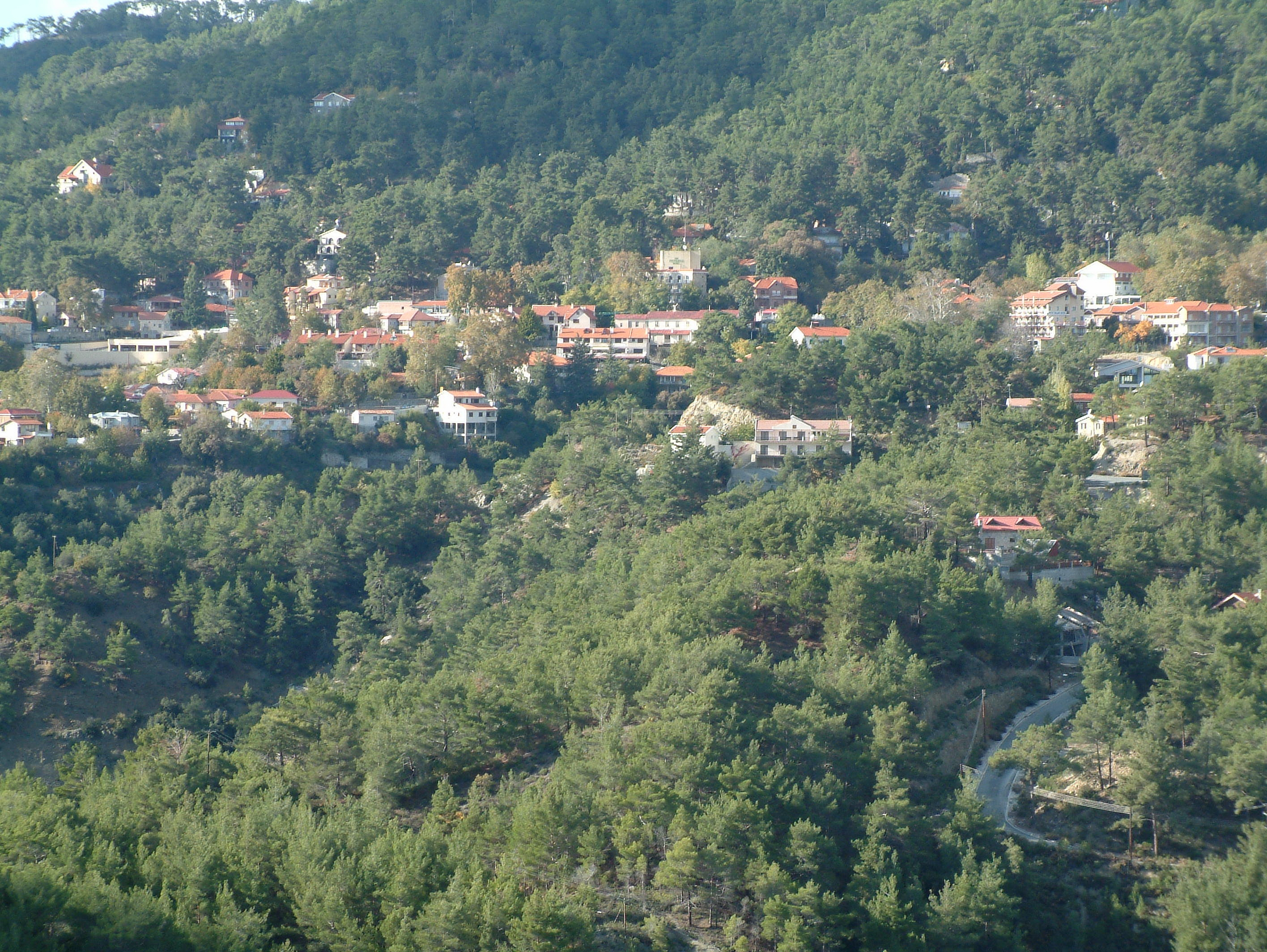
Conference site since 2004 in Platres/Cyprus

Director of staff called supervisors group for the first three conferences 1994 and 1996 in Nazareth and 2000 in Bad Segeberg/Germany was Eric Miller. His unexpected death in 2002 led to a turning point, as well as in the same year the death of Rafael Moses, who was staff-member from the beginning. At Cyprus they went on in 2004 with the fourth and in 2006 with the fifth conference: under a new name, a new design and with Anton Obholzer as a new director. 2007 PCCA was founded – Partners in Confronting Collective Atrocities –, a non-profit organization with which the founders of Nazareth-Conferences have given themselves an outward visible structure. Since 2008 PCCA took over the leadership for the conferences. In the same year for the first time Palestinians participated and in the subsequent 2010 Conference they were represented in staff with Nimer Said.

== Task and design ==
The title of the three Nazareth-Conferences – “Germans and Israelis: The Past in the Present” –, was its program. It spoke of two national groups and suggested to recognize the past of the relationship between the two target groups in the present. Thus, the conferences were able to become a place where individual and group identities could meet and where was given the opportunity to explore the chances and risks of such an encounter. The task was to find out how the current relationship to the other group was influenced by belonging to the own and how the presence of this ratio was influenced by the past. Although it was intended, thereby also to detect the underlying, unconscious fantasies, the target was not therapeutic, but learning at the moment of encounter. To address this difficult task undisturbed by the everyday life of the participants, the design of conferences presented a secure framework. Members and staff lived together in a house and worked for six days in the topic. Conference language was English. The use of one's own national language was permissible, but only if all those present dominated this language. Through all this, it gradually should be possible to perceive one's own role, which was taken at the conference in the presence of others, and explore how this role was affected by past and current psychological and social processes.

== Participants ==
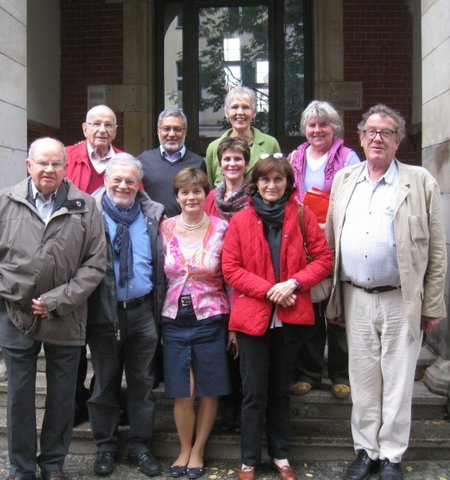
Partners in Confronting Collective Atrocities (Staff: 2011). Front: Hermann Beland/DE, Shmuel Erlich/IL, Dorothee C. von Tippelskirch-Eissing/DE, Louisa Diana Brunner/IT, Anton Obholzer/UK. Middle: Mira Erlich-Ginor/IL. Behind: Jona Rosenfeld/IL, Fakhry Davids/UK, Veronika Grüneisen/DE, Karin Lüders/DE.

As the conferences were assessed from the outset as a bold and risky venture and planned by psychoanalysts, the invitation first was directed to a kind of closed society: over various psychoanalytic associations and societies to their members. This changed later. Participants were members of the “groups in conflict” and members of staff. The staff's purpose was the management of the conference, he took over the responsibility for the frame, thus securing the boundaries of space, time and task; he presented consultants systematic or if necessary and was called for, and offered working hypotheses about what just happened. In the same time the staff was not an external observer, but as participating individuals and as a group involved in the entire process.

The participants came, as it turned out, not only from Germany and Israel, so that the division of the world in the title appeared as a “fantasy on the part of the planners”. The largest age group was built by the so-called second-generation members. But some members of the preliminary and some of the subsequent generation were represented.

Although Germans and Israelis were invited for participation, they often felt poorly perceived in their identity by these attributes. The question of identity was central, particularly for Israelis, because this question was the one that in the past had decided who was allowed to live. Everyone involved knew what finally found words: “Our parents would sit here together”.

== Structure and technique ==
The individual participants with their history stood only apparently in the focus of attention. They tentatively could be seen as representatives of their group and gave thereby an opportunity to understand the individual as a significant part of the group conflicts. In an attempt to find solutions for these group conflicts, various group processes were initiated and studied. Pathbreaking work hypothesis was that the unsolvable appearing group conflicts were based on conscious and unconscious attitudes, feelings, response readiness and fantasies, which were often establishing identity and therefore difficult to give up. Just the perception of that was accompanied by violent emotions and assumed a high willingness to affect-tolerance in the participants.

According to the purpose of the conference to obtain a deeper understanding of the causes of individual and collective group conflicts and thereby create the conditions for their solution, the method provided a system of various group constellations with either experimental or reflective character. In the one experiences should have been collected in the here and now and evaluated in the other. As far as the experience of a previous conference suggested changes in design, it has been adjusted accordingly. By the third conference, the system of the various groups had initially consolidated. Plenary, Review- and Application-Group should help to bring reflexive processes on the way, Small-Study-Group and in particular the System Event provided space for feeling, shaping and experience, therefore encounter with oneself and others. A total of 33 ½ hours were distributed over six days – even on the Sabbath. The Application-Group was later abandoned.

While the challenge in the five Plena was, to gather again and understand the events and experiences from the other groups and consider single events as part of the whole, Review- and Application-Group had other tasks. Both had the same composition of five to seven participants of the same nation and a constant consultant. In the Review-Group members had to find out what role they had taken in the entire system of the conference and whether or how they changed. The Application-Group gave the opportunity to consider how the conference experience could be effectively at home in professional or in other roles. In the Small-Study-Group both nationalities sat with a consultant six times in order to experience the behavior of the group as a group and to look at. The System Event finally stood with its seven meetings not only in time in the center of the conference. It started in two large groups of separate nationality without consultants; the staff worked throughout public in a third room. That meant he could have been visited and his work could have been observed. In an ongoing process the participants in System Event had to come to an agreement about the question who wanted to work with whom, in which room, with or without consultant, on which topic and then to do so. In this way, current conflicts appeared, which often were similar to those which were brought along. The System Event made them because currently (re)enacted, available for experience and allowed to observe and understand them in their origin and meaning. If the process threatened to derail, the staff helped with a targeted interpretation. The goal of all this, so the declared intention of the initiators, is an educational: learning through experience.

== Process ==
Each of the three conferences took a unique course, depending on the participants and their histories and stories. In the first and second conference particularly the fathers and their influence on the development of prejudices and resentments were in the foreground, while in the third conference the mothers came in the focus.

Strictly speaking, the conferences for many began even before its beginning with the almost always anxious question: Go there or not? In the ongoing process “meaningful moments” by all participants were experienced from “different events”. Stories of “perpetrators” and “victims” and the consequences of the Holocaust for future generations – already intellectually worked through by political scientists and historians – were noticeable during the conferences by individual fates and showed the big gap in the individual and personal workup. “Fantasies, Dreams, Unknowns, Unthought-knowns, Unspoken and Unspeakable” were alive. This cleared the way for change in the individual. This might be prerequisite to stop on both sides an until today continuing dumb transfer of suffered damages to subsequent generations.

Although the three conferences were not the same in composition and structure, a process became noticeable, not only during each individual conference, but also during the development of all three conferences. This process intensified during the third conference when the only interpretation that the staff made available to the participants in this conference was as follows:

“Participants have put themselves into a painful situation by coming to this conference, which can be experienced as cruel. This leads to greater dependency on staff for containment, along with fears and disappointment of fantasies about the insufficiency of staff resources. The fearful fantasies may have to do with unexpected, powerful changes in one's sense of identity and the giving up of precious parts of identity, such as the role of the victim (for the Israelis) or the guilt of perpetrators (for the Germans).”

One participant had perceived this interpretation as very disturbing but at the same time as leading forward as it had raised questions that required an answer:

“For me, the staff had expressed something unbelievable: the role of victims for the Israelis and the guilt of perpetrators for the Germans should be ‘worthy’ parts of the own identity! This is difficult to accept. The hypothesis suggested the idea that parts of this identity could be given up. But if so then what then? Wouldn't that mean for the Jewish group to dis-identify from the role of victim and for the non-Jewish group to dis-identify from the guilt of perpetrator? Wouldn't that mean to separate in a more deep way from parents who, not only in the world of inner objects but often also in real life have to be the space for our own anxiety or wishes for destruction? Where to put these feelings when the space for it would be lost? What could be the consequences for oneself as well as for the meeting with the others? Isn't one that is touching a toboo in danger of becoming a taboo? Fearful questions might follow from this hypothesis, and many more became possible.”

One participant in the Israeli group, a so-called “child survivor” had participated in all three conferences and had widely published about the subject. He was concerned about the question of whether Jews have a face for Germans. During the third conference he had apparently taken on the role of The Eternal Jew: he was carrying a plastic bag with him at all times which contained, among other things, one of his publications which he offered for sale. In it he had written:

Also, we, the professionals, like the rest, are unable to look into the eyes of those who return from death.

— Haim Dasberg, Echoes of the Holocaust

To be able to look into each other's eyes was one of the objectives of these conferences.

== Result ==
The results of the conferences were different from each other and thereby individual nature. One participant put it to words: “To look at this helps in recognizing the difference between ‘the other’ and my fantasies about him/her. This releases me from the imprisonment of fantasies and releases ‘the other’ from the world of my inner objects – I become empty and I don't need to project my inner objects on ‘the other’ any longer – it is a purifying process and I am not stuck. Then, and only then, are both (the other and myself) free to choose relationship with one another, or not.”

In addition to these and other individual insights, there was on the other hand also a collective result: two books, one in German, one in English, both appeared almost simultaneously and a really common work of all those who wanted to participate. While on the one hand the authors of the two books collected some important chapters for the understanding of the project, its history, design and structure of the conference, on the other hand the conference experience of the participants was presented as a collage: thematically ordered individual contributions of named co-authors. Mira Erlich-Ginor which was authorized by the participants to compile a collage from their contributions, wrote in her introduction: “There are conference-narratives as numerous as the number of participants in them.”

The collage was, though all were contacted and asked for participation, mainly borne by participants, who faced the conferences positive. Critical positions hardly can be found. But the two books have helped to make the project accessible for a wider public and the readers of the personal and often painful experiences of the participants were able to learn firsthand.

The reception of the conferences looked quite different in Germany and Israel: “... in contrast to the importance given to this work in Germany and elsewhere, it was not accorded the same place in Israel.” Nevertheless, the assessment “of those Israelis who attended the conferences was decidedly very positive, deeply involved and grateful.”

Through lectures, presentations and publications, the work of the conferences received international attention – initially in the psychoanalytic community. 2009 was foreseeable that they “will, and must, have a future.” A website was set up and with the PCCA the conferences opened to all interested parties, so that the project could now turn to other national groups in conflict.

== Literature ==
- Beland, Hermann (1992). "Erfahrungen aus einer Leicester-Konferenz in Israel". DPV-Informationen (in German). 12: 23–25.
- Dasberg, Haim (2000). "Myths and Taboos among Israeli First- and Second-Generation Psychiatrists in Regard to the Holocaust". Echoes of the Holocaust. Bulletin of the Jerusalem Center for Research into the Late Effects of the Holocaust. 6. Shalom Robinson: 26–36. Archived from the original on April 22, 2017.
- Eiferman, Rivka (1987). "'Deutschland' und 'die Deutschen'. Agieren von Phantasien und deren Entdeckung in der Selbstanalyse". Jahrbuch der Psychoanalyse (in German). 20: 165–206.
- Erlich, H. Shmuel; Erlich-Ginor, Mira; Beland, Hermann (2009). Fed with Tears – Poisoned with Milk. The "Nazareth" Group-Relations-Conferences. Germans and Israelis – The Past in the Present. Gießen: Psychozial. ISBN 978-3-89806-751-5.
- Erlich, H. Shmuel; Erlich-Ginor, Mira; Beland, Hermann (2009). Gestillt mit Tränen – Vergiftet mit Milch. Die Nazareth-Gruppenkonferenzen Deutsche und Israelis – Die Vergangenheit ist gegenwärtig. Gießen: Psychozial. ISBN 978-3-89806-765-2.
- Kreuzer-Haustein, Ursula (1994). "Deutsche und Israelis: Die Vergangenheit in der Gegenwart. Eine psychoanalytische Arbeitstagung in Nazareth im Juni 1994". Forum der Psychoanalyse (in German). 10: 363–370.
- Kreuzer-Haustein, Ursula (1996). "Die Teilung der psychoanalytischen Gemeinschaft und ihre Folgen". Forum der Psychoanalyse (in German). 12: 363–369.
- Kreuzer-Haustein, Ursula (2001). "Germans and Israelis: The past in the present. Dritte 'Nazareth-Konferenz' vom 21. – 26.6.2000 in Bad Segeberg/Holstein". Forum der Psychoanalyse (in German).
- Miller, Eric J. (1989). "The 'Leicester' Model: Experiential study of Group and Organizational Processes". Occasional Papers. 10. London: Tavistock Institute of Human Relations.
- Nedelmann, Carl (1998). "Die Vergangenheit in der Gegenwart zwischen Deutschen und Juden". Forum der Psychoanalyse (in German). 14 (2): 176–189. doi:10.1007/s004510050014. S2CID 143947072.
