= The Art of Sin =

Sudanese LGBT film

- Film Poster
- Arabic: فن الخطيئة
- Directed by: Ibrahim Mursal
- Written by: Ibrahim Mursal
- Produced by: Geir Bergersen
- Starring: Ahmed Umar; Ibrahim Mursal
- Cinematography: Kim Krohn Berle
- Edited by: Erland Edenholm; AbdElrahim Kattab
- Production company: Halstein Larsen
- Distributed by: Skagerak Film AS
- Release date: 2020
- Running time: 59 minutes
- Countries: Norway; Sudan
- Languages: Sudanese Arabic; English; Norwegian

The Art of Sin (Arabic: فن الخطيئة) is a 2020 Norwegian-Sudanese documentary film written and directed by Ibrahim Mursal. It is a portrait of the artist and LGBT activist Ahmed Umar, who campaigns for gay visibility and seeks new forms of expression for their (Note: Umar uses "he/him," "she/her," and "they/them" pronouns. This article uses they/them pronouns for editorial consistency.) Sudanese-Norwegian identity.

== Plot ==
Artist Ahmed Umar arrived in Norway in 2008 as a refugee from their native country, Sudan, which at the time was one of seven nations that executed people for same-sex conduct. Seven years later, in 2015, when Umar came out on Facebook, as one of the first openly gay man from Sudan, a large portion of the Sudanese community turned against him, including relatives.

Moving to Norway, Umar quickly learns that even a liberal country can be dangerous for openly gay immigrants and is beaten during a Pride event.

Despite everything, Umar longs to go back and re-establish their connection to their family and country. But will they welcome him or reject him? At that time, homosexuality was still punishable by death in Sudan.

Once Umar returned to Sudan, Umar tip-toes their way around the country to meet their mother and other members of the LGBT community in Sudan. The film shows the extent of fear the Sudanese LGBT community feels from the society and the law. Umar discusses the roots of homophobia in Sudan and its link to colourism in Sudan. The journey in Sudan ends with Umar taking photographs with other Sudanese LGBT, but with Umar ’s face obscuring theirs. This photographic project was later named “carrying the face of ugliness” (Arabic: شايل وش القباحة), which describes a person who does something unfamiliar, confronts an issue and takes the blame for it. In this case, being gay.

Although the film focuses on Umar; the film director, Mursal, has to face his deeply held views rooted in religion and culture. As an immigrant himself, Mursal struggles with the notion of home, identity, and belonging.

The film ends with Umar becoming a Norwegian citizen, and attending the citizenship ceremony wearing an outfit that mixes Sudanese and Norwegian cultures, i.e., Identity-Embroidered. Mursal helps Umar fix their outfit before the ceremony, in contrast to sitting far away from Ahmed at the beginning of the film.

== Screening and reception ==
Due to the COVID-19 pandemic, the film was not screened until the end of 2021, accumulating mostly positive reviews. As of Oct. 2022, the film has a rating of 7.7 in IMDb.

The Art of Sin won the 2020 Nordic Doc's best documentary film award between 30 and 60 minutes.

== See also ==
- Cinema of Sudan
- LGBT rights in Sudan
- This Arab Is Queer
