= Guapa (disambiguation) =

Guapa is an album released by the band La Oreja de Van Gogh

Guapa (pretty) may also refer to:

- "Guapa" (song), by Diego Torres
- "Guapa", a song by Becky G from Esquemas
- "Guapa", a song by Los Bukis from Y Para Siempre
- "Guapa", a song by RAF Carmona
- "Guapas", a song by Bandana
- Guapa (novel), first novel by writer Saleem Haddad
- Guapas, an Argentine telenovela
- Gloria Piedimonte, Italian singer and actress, known as "La guapa"
