= This Arab Is Queer =

2022 LGBTQ+ anthology book

This Arab Is Queer: An Anthology by LGBTQ+ Arab Writers
- First edition cover
- Editor: Elias Jahshan
- Authors: Khalid Abdel-Hadi; Amna Ali; Madian Aljazeera; Mona Eltahawy; Raja Farah; Saleem Haddad; Zeyn Joukhadar; Amrou Al-Kadhi; Dima Mikhayel Matta; Hasan Namir; Danny Ramadan; Tania Safi; Omar Sakr; Anbara Salam; Hamed Sinno; Ahmed Umar; Amina; Anonymous
- Language: English
- Genre: LGBTQ+ anthology
- Published: 2022
- Publisher: Saqi Books
- Publication place: United Kingdom
- Media type: Print
- Pages: 288
- ISBN: 978-0-86356-478-9
- OCLC: 1334646295

This Arab Is Queer: An Anthology by LGBTQ+ Arab Writers is a 2022 LGBTQ+ anthology featuring the memoirs of eighteen queer Arab writers, hailing from eleven Arab countries and the diaspora. The book is edited by Elias Jahshan, and was the finalist in the 2023 Lambda Literary Awards and Bread and Roses Award. This Arab Is Queer received critical acclaim for its portrayal of queer Arab experiences, with Time magazine calling it a "groundbreaking work".

The stories in the book explore the varied experiences of queer Arabs and challenge negative stereotypes often perpetuated by Western media. Many of the stories touch on themes such as displacement, loneliness, coming out, and the importance of community.

== Background ==
LGBTQ+ people in the Middle East face legal and social challenges that limit their freedoms and restrict their rights. In most of the Middle Eastern countries, LGBT+ individuals have limited rights, face hostility and discrimination, and are often subjected to legal penalties. Specifically, same-sex relations are illegal in nine of the 18 countries that make up the region, and in five of those countries, such relationships are punishable by death.

The Middle East has some of the world's most restrictive legislation for LGBT+ people, with LGBT+ individuals often living in secrecy and facing vigilante execution, harassment, discrimination, and violence. In some countries, LGBT+ organisations are illegal, and members of the community can be arrested or punished for participating in these organisations or expressing their identity. Furthermore, societal and cultural norms in the Middle East often stigmatise and shame LGBT+ individuals, leading to exclusion, ostracization, and violence from family and community members.

In recent years, there have been some signs of progress for LGBT+ rights in the Middle East, with some countries taking small steps towards recognising and supporting the community. However, these efforts have been met with significant pushback from conservative groups, and LGBT+ individuals continue to face significant challenges in the region. As such, the fight for LGBT+ rights in the Middle East remains ongoing and challenging, with much work to be done to ensure that all individuals, regardless of their sexual orientation or gender identity, can live freely and without fear.

== Content ==
The editor Elias Jahshan, a Palestinian and Lebanese Australian journalist and writer living in London, introduces the book as seeking to reclaim the narrative and allow queer Arabs to tell their own stories on their own terms. The book then delves into the authors' stories.

=== Mona Eltahawy: The Decade of Saying All That I Could Not Say ===
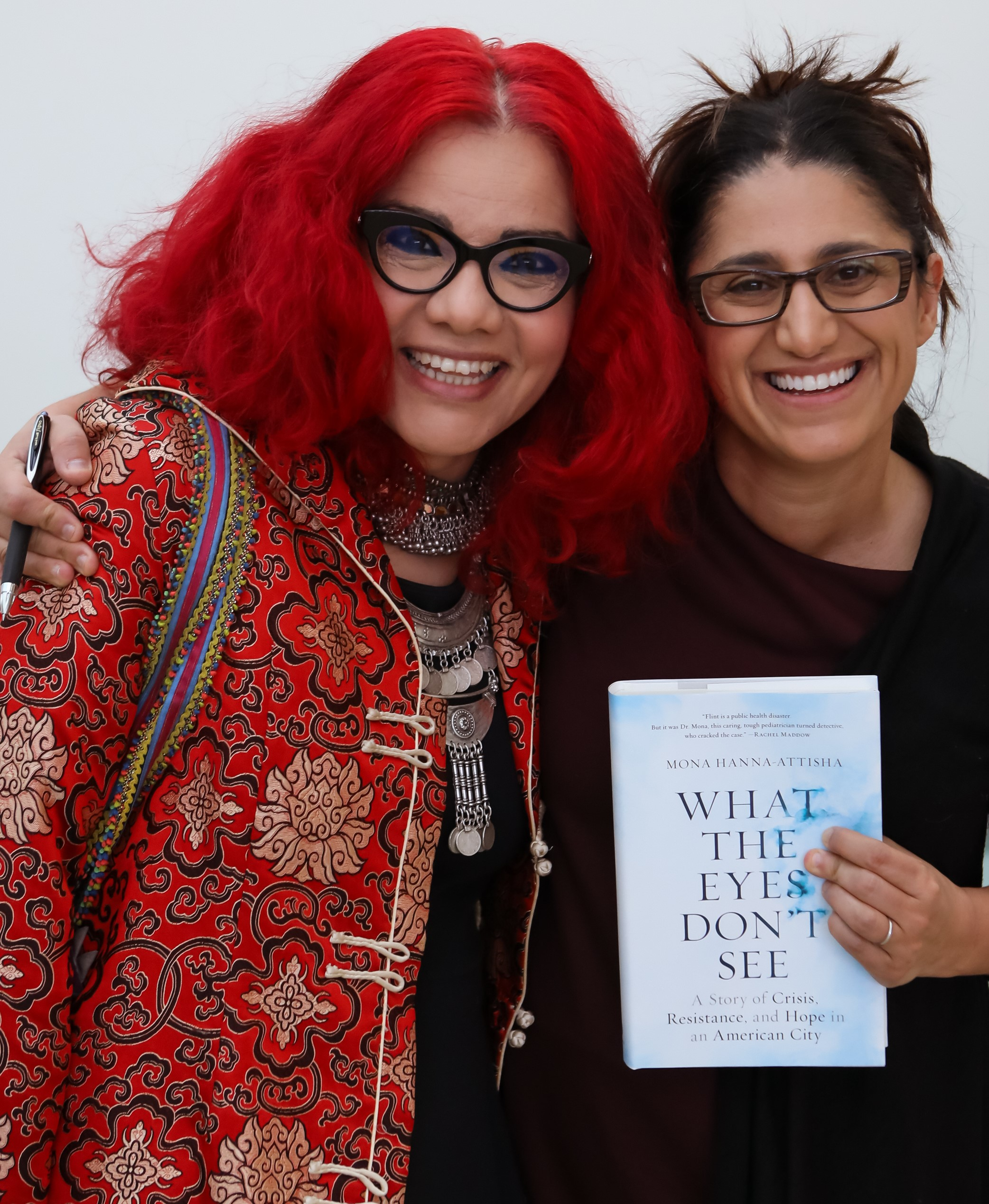
Mona Eltahawy (left) and 2017 MIT Disobedience Award winner Mona Hanna-Attisha

Mona Eltahawy, an Egyptian-American journalist and feminist, starts with "I am able to write this because I died ten years ago" after being beaten, sexually assaulted, and detained by Egyptian police. Eltahawy shares their experiences with abortion, sex, and menopause and discusses their journey to embracing polyamory and identifying as queer. They conclude by reflecting on their past feminism, which focused solely on misogyny, and how they eventually came to advocate for the LGBTQ+ community in Egypt.

=== Saleem Haddad: Return to Beirut ===
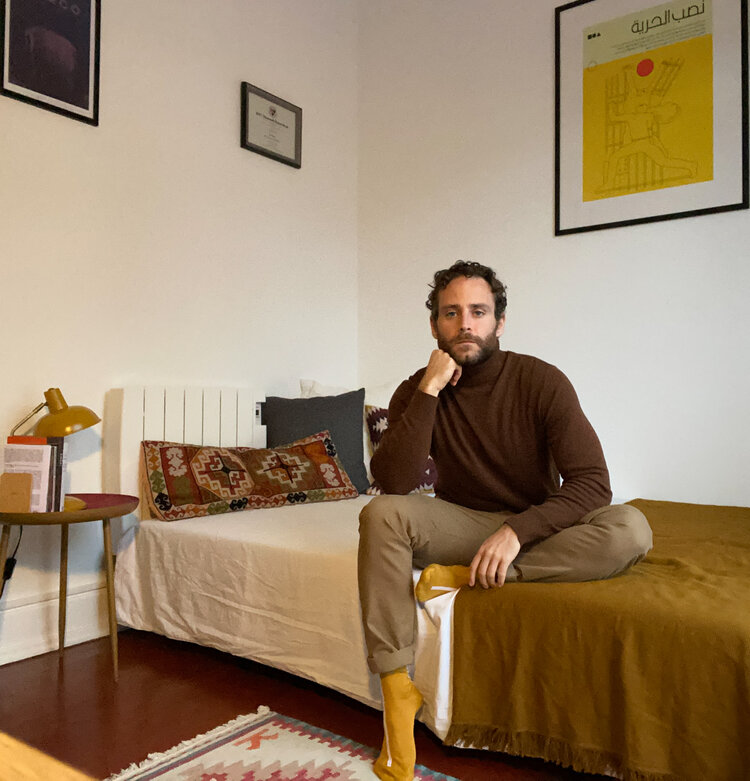
Saleem Haddad in 2020

Saleem Haddad, an author and filmmaker of Iraqi-German and Palestinian-Lebanese descent, returns to Beirut after eighteen years and reflects on their past visit, their decision to leave Lebanon, and their parents' return to Lebanon in 2019. Haddad learns about the 2020 Beirut explosion while living in Lisbon and is delaying the mourning of their destroyed family home and the death of the Lebanon they once knew. Haddad reflects on the trauma that has affected their family and friends. Haddad visits a former lover, where they have sex and are reminded of why they could never have a deeper emotional connection with them.

=== Dima Mikhayel Matta: This Text Is a Very Lonely Document (In memory of my father) ===
Dima Mikhayel Matta, Beirut-based writer and actress, grieves the loss of their father's stories due to a cognitive impairment and sees forgetfulness as a constant slipping away. Matta also reflects on their own relationship with words and the fear of losing them. Matta ends by pondering the question of who their father will be when he is stripped of his stories and what they will be when stripped of their words.

=== Zeyn Joukhadar: Catching the Light: Reclaiming Opera as a Trans Arab ===
Zeyn Joukhadar, a Syrian American writer, shares his experiences with music, particularly opera, a predominantly white space, and how it intersects with their identity as a trans person of colour and their trauma and impostor syndrome. Joukhadar examines how low voices are associated with powerful and villainous characters and how white supremacy creates a binary gender system where non-white bodies are seen as foils. Joukhadar reflects on his own gender-nonconforming Arab identity and how expressions of femininity as a transmasculine person are perceived as less white and more dangerous. They also discuss the limitations of language and how it shapes identity in opera.

=== Amrou Al-Kadhi: You Made Me Your Monster ===
Amrou Al-Kadhi, a British-Iraqi drag performer and writer, discusses the concept of transgression and how it can be both liberating and dangerous, depending on the context and intention. Al-Kadhi shares their personal experiences of transgression, including how they were perceived as a transgressive entity by their Iraqi family for displaying individuality, which was seen as a threat to the collective self. Al-Kadhi also discusses the benefits and drawbacks of the familial collective mentality, where the individual's actions are seen as a measure of their parents' success in raising them.

=== Khalid Abdel-Hadi: My.Kali – Digitising a Queer Arab Future ===
Khalid Abdel-Hadi, editor-in-chief and founder of My.Kali, a digital magazine about the LGBTQ+ community in Jordan, recounts how the media hijacked the cover of the first edition of the magazine and outed him to the public, causing distress and attracting negative attention from journalists and the public alike. Abdel-Hadi refused to close the magazine down despite pressure from friends and censorship and continued to run it, building a team of editors and designers.

=== Danny Ramadan: The Artist's Portrait of a Marginalised Man ===
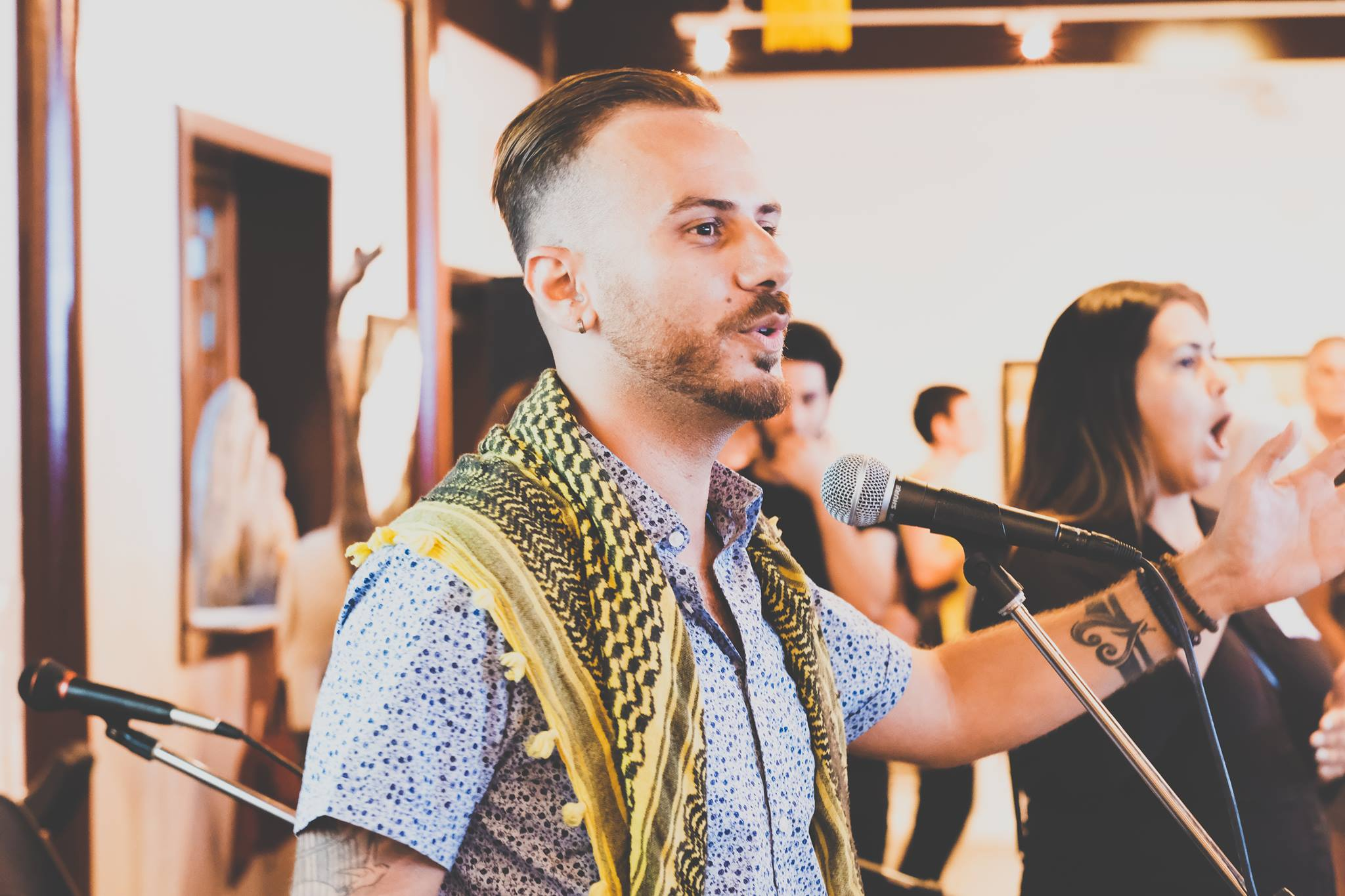
Danny Ramadan in 2016

Danny Ramadan, an award-winning Syrian-Canadian novelist and LGBTQ-refugee activist, talks about the harmful tendency of some readers to assume that the work of marginalised authors is solely based on their experiences, which can overlook the complexity of those experiences. Ramadan shares his experience meeting André Aciman, who also faces similar assumptions, and questions the pressure on marginalised authors to be social justice warriors and write excellent literature. He suggests that these authors can write whatever they want, whether based on their experiences or not, and may choose to keep their traumas private.

=== Ahmed Umar: Pilgrimage to Love ===
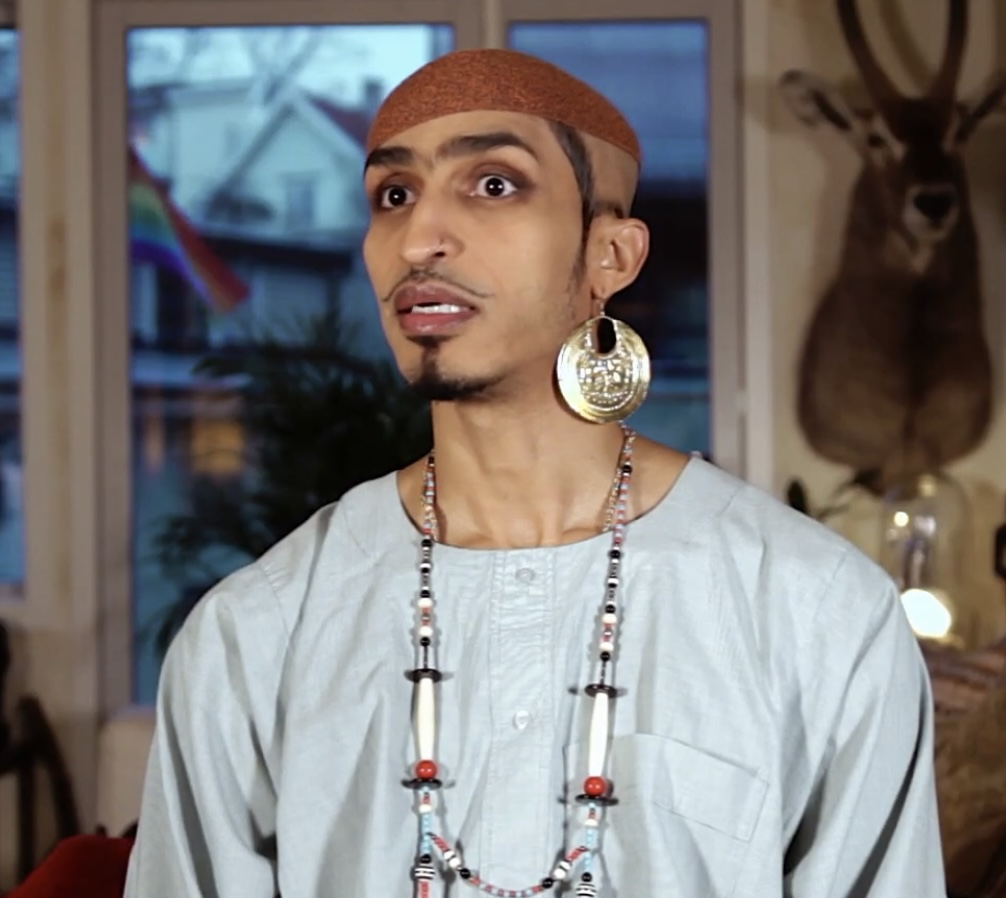
Ahmed Umar during an interview in 2021

Ahmed Umar is a Sudanese-Norwegian artist who creates tactile and object-based artworks to communicate with his audience. He grew up in a conservative Sudanese family living in Mecca and felt societal pressure to conform to certain behaviours and appearances. However, he later kissed his friend Adel, which left him feeling conflicted and questioning his sexuality. Ahmed then had a "halal relationship" with a female and planned to build a home together, but he ended up sharing a mattress with his friend Ashraf on the roof of a bus, and ended up kissing. They continued their intimate relationship for a year and a half before Ahmed moved to Norway.

=== Amina: An August, a September and My Mother ===
Amina, a pseudonym of an Egyptian writer, who shares two moments of joy, one at a Mashrou' Leila concert where brave individuals raised rainbow flags, and another on a romantic beach night where they saw a shooting star with their partner. Despite accepting their queerness and never feeling shame, Amina is unable to share these happy moments with their mother due to societal constraints. Amina also reflects on the suicide of a queer person named Sarah and the fear within the community. They explore their relationship with God and the contrast of their mother's happiness at their brother's wedding versus their potential future wedding.

=== Raja Farah: The Bad Son ===
Raja Farah, a queer activist and writer from Lebanon, shares a story about Layth, who is at the hospital with his father Nizar. Layth reflects on their troubled relationship while talking to a friend about sex and relationships. Layth meets Mazen, an old flame he met on Grindr, and the passage details their past relationship, which was full of great sex and affection but never developed into a deep romance.

=== Tania Safi: Dating White People ===
Tania Safi, an Arab-Australian journalist, reflects on her family's history and her own struggles with cultural identity. Safi also discusses her experiences with racism and denial of her Arab heritage during her teen years in Australia. Additionally, she shares her experiences as a queer Arab person in Sydney, including living with a white lesbian couple and dating a white lesbian who fetishises her Arab heritage.

=== Amna Ali: My Intersectionality Was My Biggest Bully ===
Amna Ali, a Somali-Yemeni-Emirati Black and queer rights activist, shares their personal experience growing up in a family of religious immigrants, highlighting the intersectionality of discrimination and oppression. They suffered severe physical and emotional trauma at the hands of their brother, but sought therapy, forgave themselves and cut off homophobic family members. They founded The Black Arabs Collective to share experiences of being Black and Queer but faced rejection from a Saudi YouTuber's podcast after openly identifying as queer, highlighting the ongoing struggle for acceptance.

=== Hamed Sinno: Trio ===
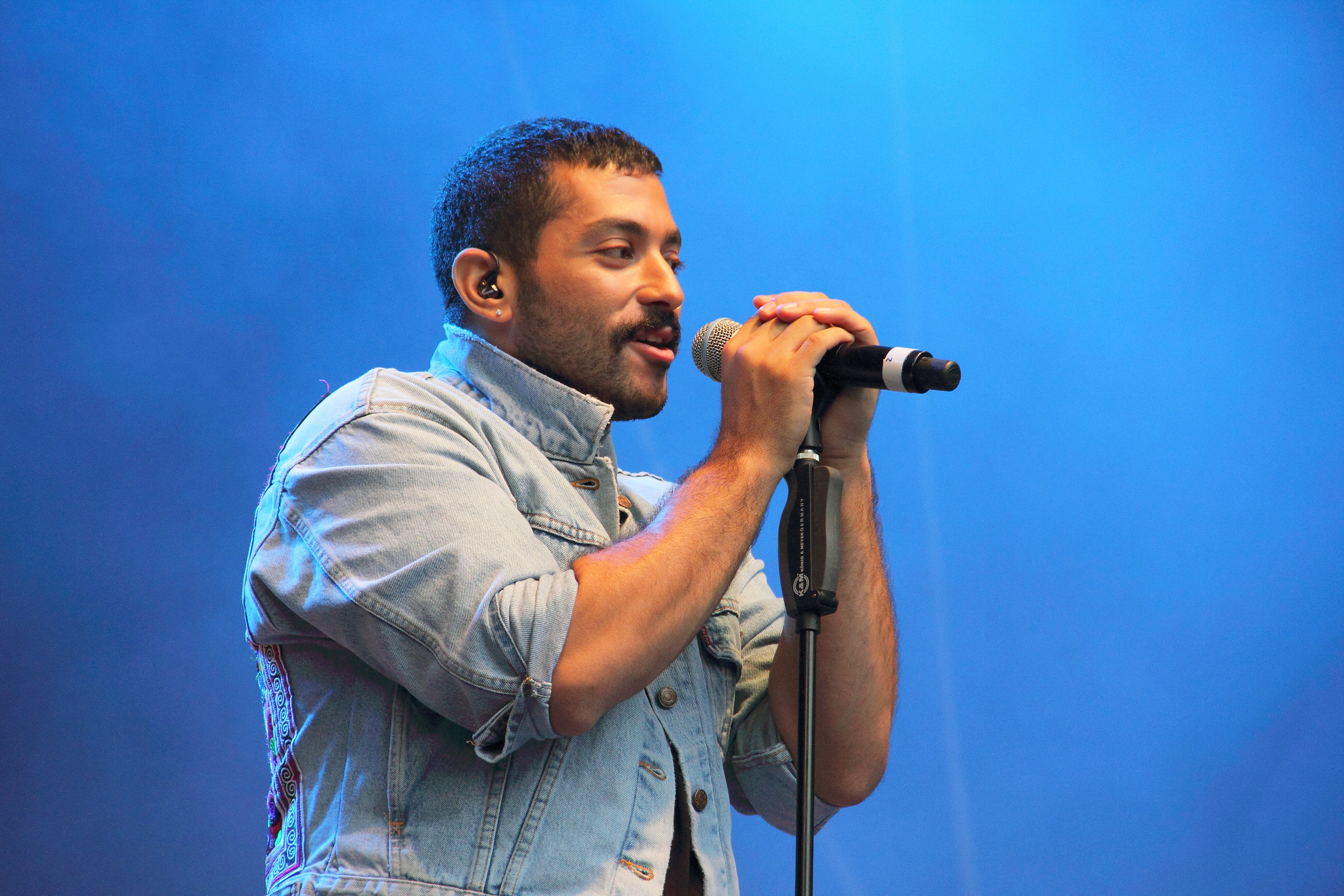
Hamed Sinno, from Mashrou' Leila, at Rudolstadt-Festival 2018

Hamed Sinno, a Lebanese-American lead singer of Mashrou' Leila, explores the significance of singing as an act of resistance and agency for marginalized individuals. Sinno shares personal experiences and reflections on the cultural significance of music, gender and sexuality, and the role of antisocial queerness in reclaiming and weaponizing femininity.

=== Anbara Salam: Unheld Conversations ===
Anbara Salam, a writer of Palestinian-Lebanese-Scottish heritage, reflects on their parents' lack of discussion regarding the queer identity of the protagonist in their second novel. Salam feels disappointed and betrayed by their parents' silence, but acknowledges that the silence around queerness in Arab culture serves a purpose in protecting people from legal and social repercussions. As a diasporic Arab, Salam has a complex relationship with identity and experiences guilt and self-doubt, recognizing that silence can hold a place for concealment, secrecy, deception, and reverence.

=== Anonymous: Trophy Hunters, White Saviours and Grindr (A queer Arab's search for a husband) ===
Anonymous, a gay Arab writer and comedian, discusses the difficulties he has faced in finding a partner due to his ethnicity and sexual orientation because he feels objectified because of his ethnicity. In addition, Anonymous describes three encounters with individuals who exhibited white saviourism towards him. Anonymous also highlights the societal expectations of marriage and how being gay adds to the challenge.

=== Hasan Namir: Dancing Like Sherihan ===
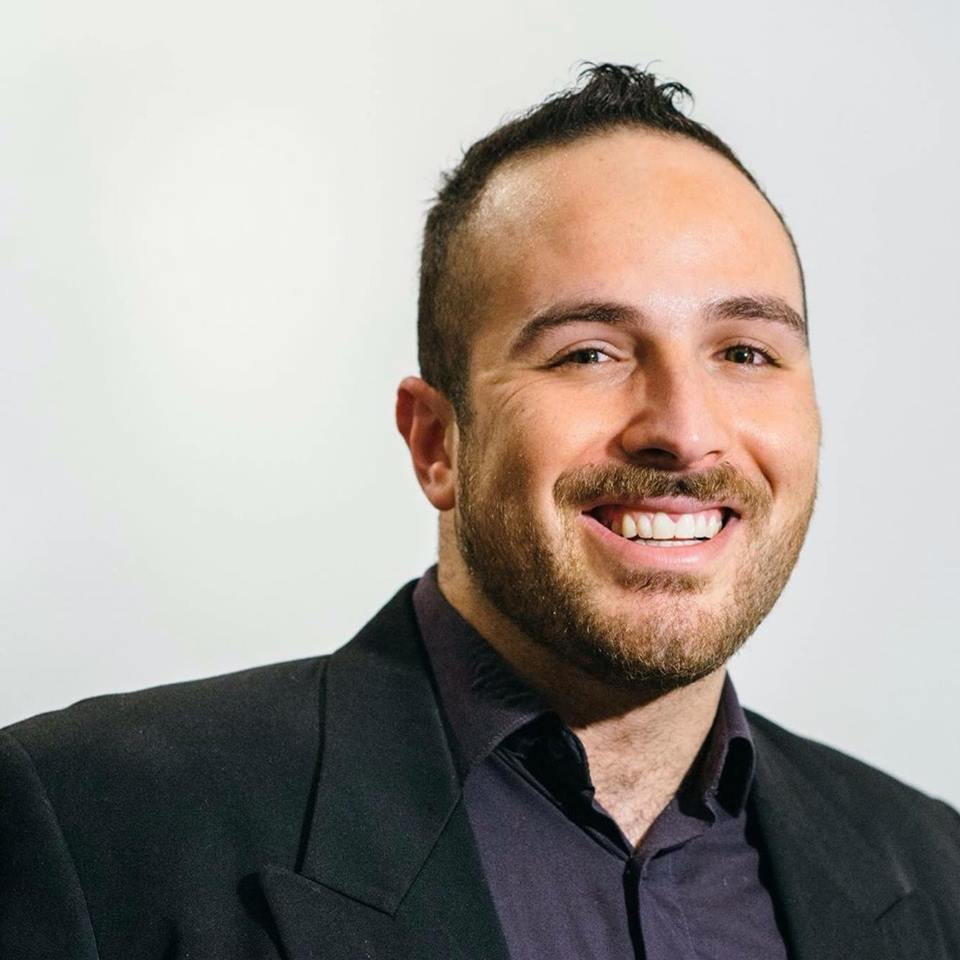
Hasan Namir in 2016

The passage is a personal narrative of a queer Muslim Iraqi-Canadian Hasan Namir, who recounts their earliest memory of being fascinated with Sherihan, an Egyptian performer, and how they struggled to reconcile their attraction to other boys with their religious beliefs and family's expectations of them. Namir describes an incident at the age of ten when a boy named M took advantage of them, and how they emigrated to Canada soon after to escape their shame. Namir also reveals their love for music, performing, and same-sex attraction, and how they came out to their sister when they were fourteen years old.

=== Madian Aljazerah: Then Came Hope ===
Madian Aljazerah, Palestinian-Jordanian who was born in Kuwait, was on a flight when they noticed an elderly Palestinian man who was confused and distressed due to Alzheimer's, and had lost his wife fifteen years ago. Aljazerah was moved by the man's love for his wife and realised that they too craved such love, but felt they could never have it due to their displacement.

=== Omar Sakr: Tweets to a Queer Arab Poet ===
"Every reader is different: when words meet a body, they change. You think you know this, know the types of reader, types of people, that you have made them legible, and you have already bent to meet them, already travelled to the middle ground to be accessible to who you have imagined. This is a fantasy. Look around your middle ground. You are the only one there"

— Omar Sakr, This Arab Is Queer, p.153

Omar Sakr, a bisexual Muslim Australian writer, essayist and poet of Lebanese and Turkish heritage. Sakr shares a collection of thoughts on various topics such as suicide, fear of loss, authenticity, pandemic, trauma, language, and performance. Sakr encourages readers to embrace movement, welcome their feelings, and let go of shame.

== Release and reception ==
This Arab Is Queer was released in 2022 in bookstores in the UK, USA, Canada, Australia, and other English-language speaking markets, as well as select English-language bookstores across Europe, Lebanon and Turkey. It's also available online globally as an ebook.

The book has received critical acclaim for its portrayal of queer Arab experiences, which critics viewed as powerful and moving. It has been hailed as "groundbreaking" by the Time, and a work that challenges stereotypes and promotes understanding and acceptance of LGBTQ+ Arabs. Pip Ellwood-Hughes admits that being a white gay man makes the text a challenging read but one that offers unique perspectives that are not often seen. Ellwood-Hughes found the stories to be eye-opening and to shed light on a part of the queer experience that he had not been exposed to before.

The essays and memoirs in the book was described by the Time as offering a rich and diverse exploration of queer Arab identity, culture, and belonging, and provide heart-warming connections and moments of celebration. Aneesha Hussain compared the book to a painting that may appear obvious at first glance, but upon closer inspection, it reveals its hidden beauty and layers that holds stories that might not be visible to the reader initially but can be discovered with a deeper look. Richard Marcus described the book as "is sometimes difficult, always intriguing and definitely compelling". Khaliden Nas acknowledges some critiques of the writing, but ultimately found the text significant for its unflinching, pointed, and vulnerable portrayal of queer Arab experiences, and its call to remember to imagine hope for ourselves.

Sleiman El Hajj analysis of the book highlights the importance of this anthology as a means of reclaiming Arab queerness from Western-centric narratives and the white saviour complex. El Hajj praises the anthology for consciously addressing potential critiques and for its unflinching, vulnerable storytelling that demands readers to look beyond the obvious and acknowledge the stories of those on the margins. The essay notes that the anthology is not without its flaws, such as some writing veering towards repeating inspirational refrains, but overall, - according to El Hajj - "This Arab is Queer" is a significant and impactful read that challenges readers to confront the spaces between the queer community and imagine hope for themselves and others.

The book has also been nominated for prestigious literary awards. In the US, it was a finalist in the 2023 Lambda Literary Awards (aka the Lammies) in the LGBTQ+ Anthology category, while in the UK it was shortlisted for the 2023 Bread and Roses Award.
