= Ibrahim Mursal =

Norwegian film director of Sudanese and Somali origins (1990-)

- إبراهيم مُرسال
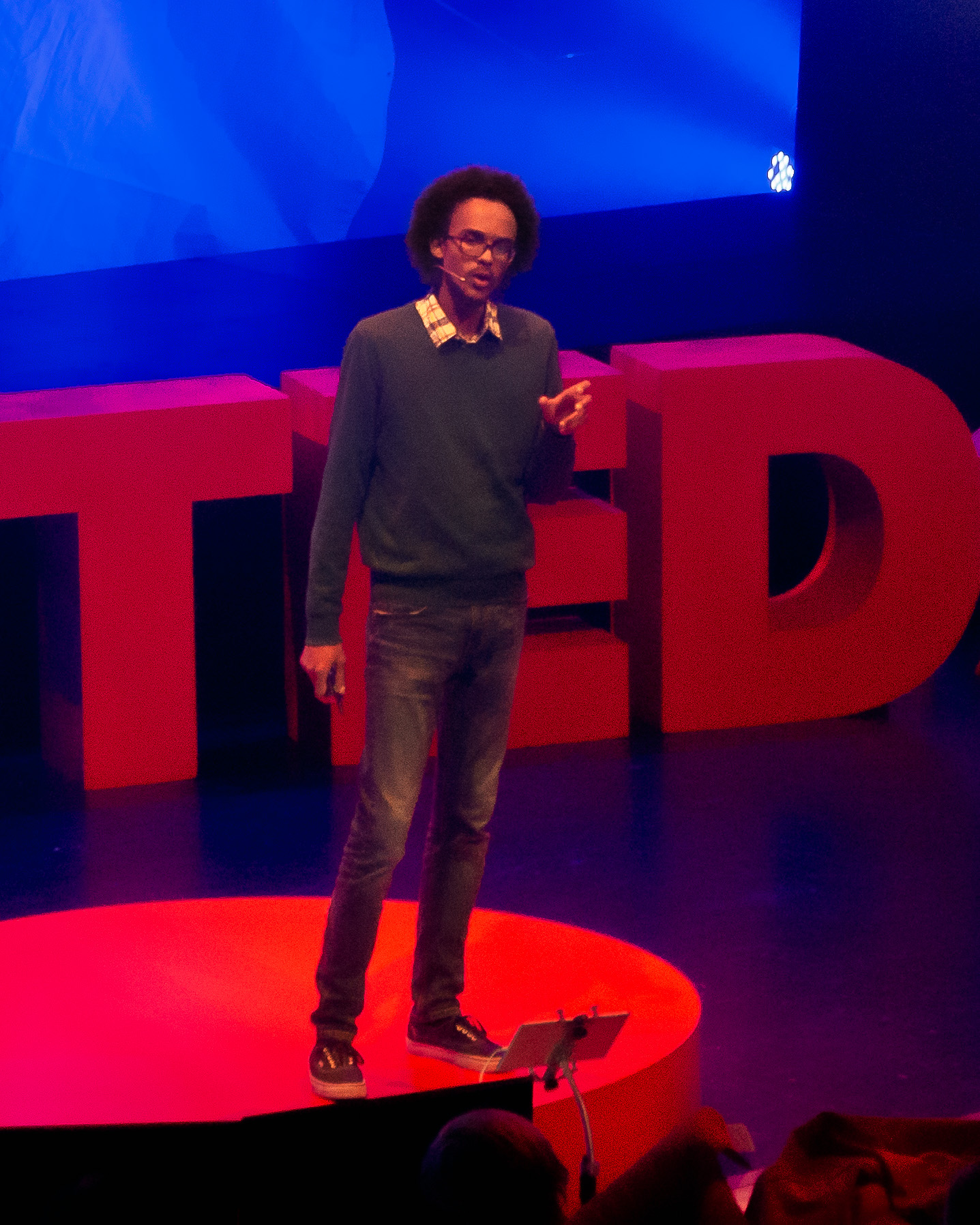
- Ibrahim Mursal at TEDxArendal, Norway, 2015; Photo: Birgit Fostervold
- Born: 1990 (age 35–36)
- Citizenship: Norway; Sudan; Somalia
- Education: Sudan University of Science and Technology
- Years active: 2012-
- Known for: The Art of Sin
- Awards: 2020 Nordic Doc's best documentary film between 30 and 60 minutes
- Honours: 2021 Nordic Film Lab

Ibrahim Mursal Warsame (Arabic: إبراهيم مُرسال, born 1990 ) is a Norwegian film director of Sudanese and Somali origins. He is known for writing and directing The Art of Sin, a documentary about openly gay Sudanese artist Ahmed Umar.

== Early life and education ==
Mursal was born in 1990 in Somalia but fled with his family during the civil war. In Sudan, he obtained a Bachelor's degree in Oil and Gas exploration from the Sudan University of Science and Technology (SUST) in 2012. He completed a Film and Photographic Arts workshop at Goethe-Institute Sudan in 2012 which (re)kindled his interest in filmmaking.

He was part of the 2014 TEDxKhartoum organising team which was shut down on 11 May 2013 by the Sudanese National Intelligence and Security Service (NISS) without an explanation or warning after the NISS previously approved it. He continued to participate in organising more TEDx events, including TEDxSUST.

After 12 years in Sudan, Mursal settled in Norway. As of November 2022, he is part of Groruddalen Think Tank and is the owner of the Warsame Movies.

== Film career ==
After completing the Film and Photographic Arts course at Goethe Institute Sudan in 2012, Mursal filmed his first short movie, 50 piasters (Arabic: ٥٠ قرش). The film is an anthropology film that looks into a day in the life of a 50 piasters, moving to different hands, touching different lives, similar to the 1955 Greek movie The Counterfeit Coin. The film was screened at the first Sudan Independent Film Festival.

Stories that address the idea of ‘the otherness’ and the essence of identity became a common theme in Mursal's films as he uses his diverse background, growing up in three different cultures, and his quest for an identity, being accustomed to feeling out of place. His films also examine the diaspora identity and how social movements, across national borders, affect the diaspora identity.

Despite growing up in a religiously conservative community, Mursal's work ventures into progressive movements that challenge gender roles, culture, taboos, etc. His films 2017, The art of being a sinner, A conversation with my gay friend and 2022 The Art of Sin (Arabic: فن الخطيئة) were delicate portrait of the Sudanese-Norwegian artist and LGBT activist Ahmed Umer, who campaigns for gay visibility in Sudan and seeks new form to express his new Norwegian identity while embracing being Sudanese.

== Awards ==
The Art of Sin won the 2020 Nordic Doc's best documentary film between 30 and 60 minutes. Mursal received the 2020 Norwegian Art Council film grant and was selected as Nordic Film Lab participants for 2021.

== Filmography ==
- 2020: The Art of Sin (Arabic: فن الخطيئة), documentary.
- 2017: The art of being a sinner, A conversation with my gay friend. a short documentary.
- 2014: Filim (Arabic: فيلم), short film.
- 2012: 50 piasters (Arabic: ٥٠ قرش), short film.

== See also ==
- Mohamed Ibrahim Warsame (Hardawi)
- Yasmin Warsame
- K'naan Warsame
