= Danny Ramadan =

Syrian–Canadian novelist, public speaker, and LGBTQ-refugee activist

Danny Ramadan داني رمضان
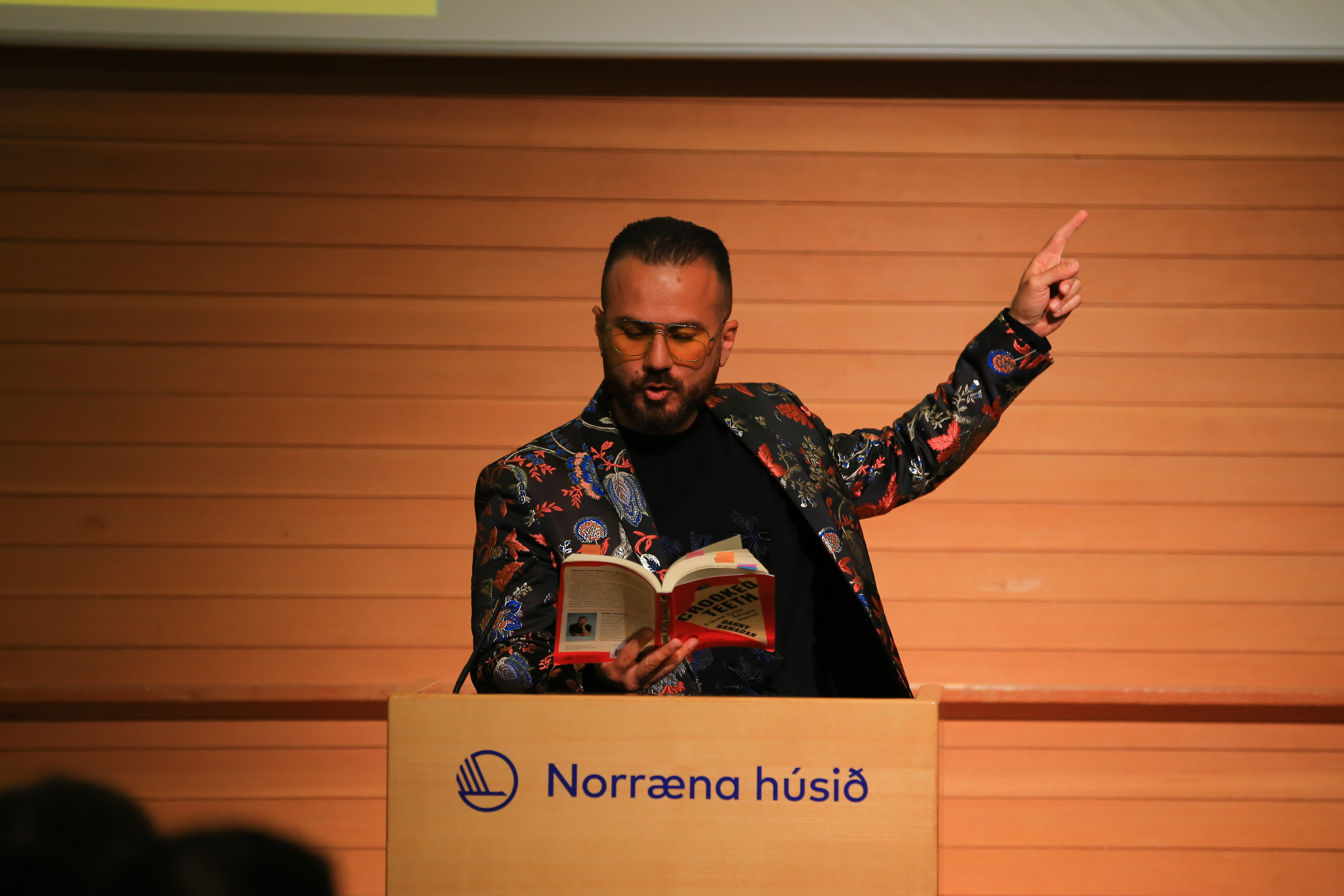
- Ramadan reading at the Iceland Writers Retreat
- Born: May 31, 1984 (age 42); Damascus, Syria
- Occupations: Author, activist
- Writing career
- Notable awards: Lambda Literary Award for Gay Fiction (2023)
- Website: dannyramadan.com

Danny Ramadan (Arabic: داني رمضان; born May 31, 1984) is a Syrian and Canadian novelist, public speaker, and LGBTQ-refugee activist who was born in Damascus, Syria. Ramadan's work focuses on themes of immigration, identity, diaspora and belonging. His debut novel, The Clothesline Swing, won multiple awards. The Foghorn Echoes won the 2023 Lambda Literary Award for Gay Fiction. His memoir, Crooked Teeth, was a Governor General Award finalist

== Writing ==
=== The Clothesline Swing ===
The Clothesline Swing is Ramadan's debut novel in English. Inspired by One Thousand and One Nights, the novel tells the epic story of two lovers anchored to the memory of a dying Syria. One is a Hakawati, a storyteller, keeping life in forwarding motion by relaying remembered fables to his dying partner. Each night he weaves stories of his childhood in Damascus, of the cruelty he has endured for his sexuality, of leaving home, of war, of his fated meeting with his lover. Meanwhile, Death himself, in his dark cloak, shares the house with the two men, eavesdropping on their secrets as he awaits their final undoing.

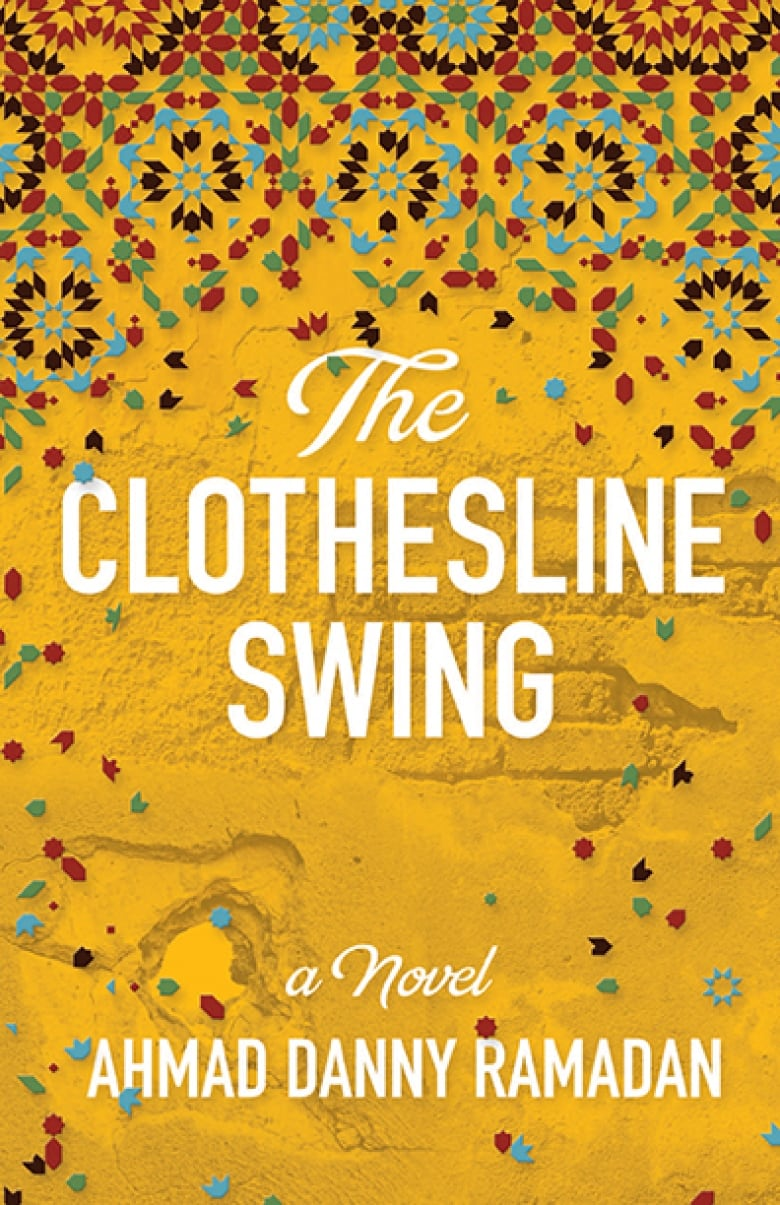
Cover of the first edition of The Clothesline Swing – Nightwood Editions

In its review, titled "The Sweetest Taboo", Winnipeg Free Press stated the author "has crafted a novel that compels readers to share — vicariously, with his characters — the beauty and history of Syria, the horrors of civil war and the joy, release, and pain of forbidden love." adding that the novel is "an enjoyable if challenging, cultural and historical excursion."

Publishers Weekly called the work "remarkable" stating that "Ramadan's delicate use of imagery links these narratives, allowing them to reverberate with meaning and emotion."

"This debut novel from the Vancouver-based Syrian writer reads as many things," wrote Kamal Al-Solaylee for Canadian magazine Quill and Quire, "a coming-out memoir, a history lesson, a critique of authoritarianism, a narrative about sharing narratives – but above all, it's a requiem for a dying country and people." The Globe and Mail called the novel "sombre, fantastical, violent and tender," adding that Ramadan's "English-language debut is a gay son's conflicted love letter to Syria."

The Georgia Straight called Ramadan's narration "fragmented, poetic, and rich with magic realism," adding that the novel "is a lesson in both artistic mastery and human resilience. And, unexpectedly: joy."

The Clothesline Swing won the Independent Publisher Book Awards' Golden Medal in the LGBT category, as well as the Canadian Authors Association's Fred Kerner Award for Best Overall Fiction Book in 2018, was picked among The Globe and Mail's 100 Best Books 2017, and was number 7 of the Toronto Star Top 10 Books of 2017. It was long listed on the CBC's Canada Reads 2018 contest, shortlisted to the Forest of Reading's Evergreen Award 2018, shortlisted for the Lambda Literary Award Gay Fiction category in 2018, and longlisted for Sunburst Award for Excellence in Canadian Literature of the Fantastic.

The Clothesline Swing was translated to Hebrew and released in May 2018 as well as French, to be released in August 2019. The book was re-launched in the UK by British Publisher The Indigo Press.

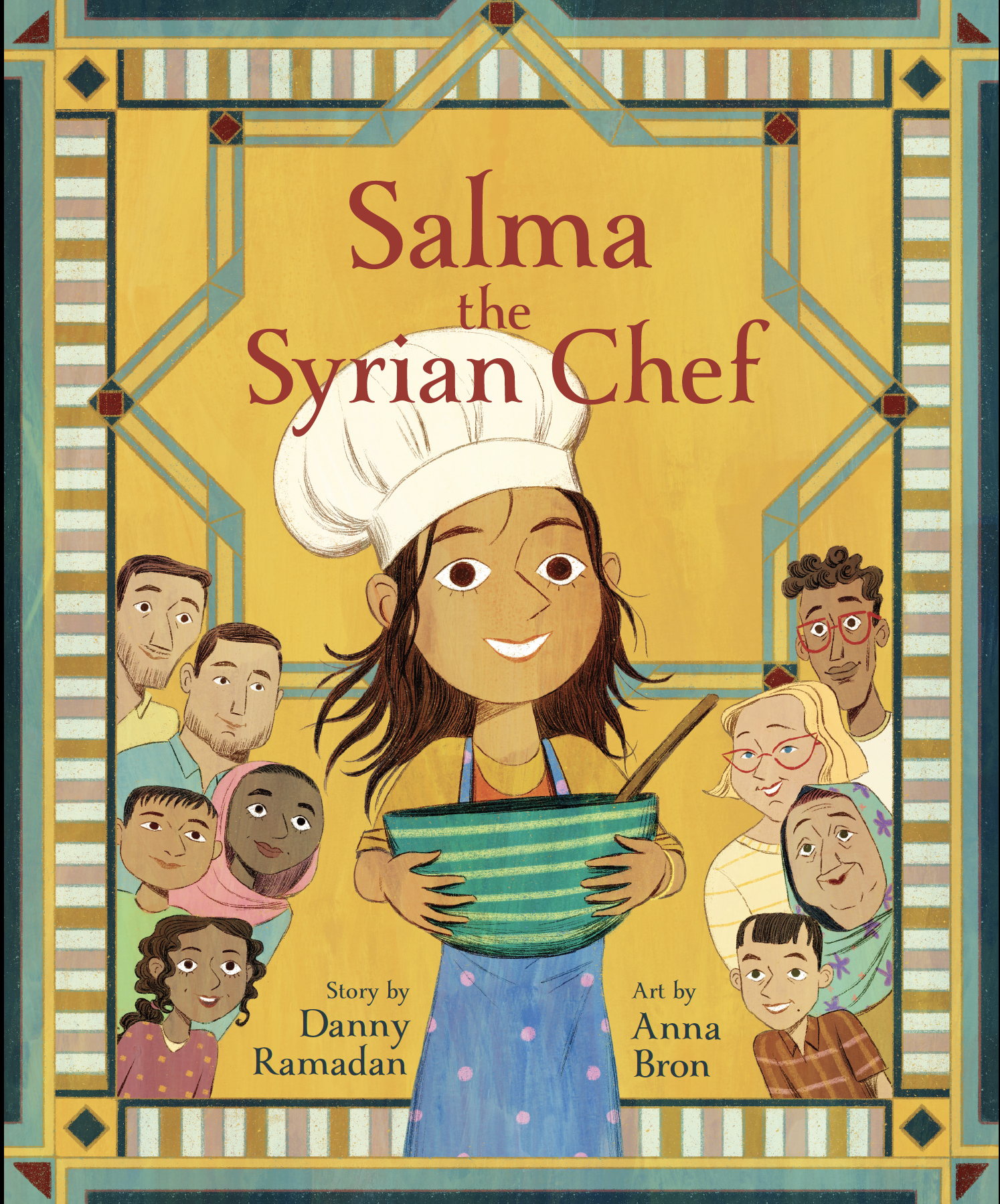
Cover of Salma the Syrian Chef – Annick Press

=== Salma the Syrian Chef ===
His children's book, Salma the Syria Chef, was released in 2020 by Annick Press. The picture book tells the story of newcomer Salma whose mother is struggling to adjust to their new life in Canada. Salma decides to uplift her mother's spirit by cooking a traditional Syrian meal for her, with the help of their new friends in the Welcome Home they are living at.

“Salma is deeply relatable in her determination, frustration, and sensitivity, especially in moments when things do not go as planned," wrote Shannon Ozirny for Quill and Quire. The book was also positively reviewed by Kirkus Reviews, who stated, "This beautiful story grasps diversity, exploring resilience, love, friendship, and the meaning of home." Publishers Weekly praised the book's inclusive messages: "Ramadan writes with poetic immediacy about displacement, home, and family."

The book evolved into a series of early reader chapter books, including Salma Makes a Home, Salma Writes a Book, Salma Joins the Team, and Salma Speaks Up.

For his children books, Ramadan was nominated to the Silver Birch Express Award multiple times, The Publishing Triangle Award, and was nominated to over eighteen awards and best-of lists.

=== Crooked Teeth: A Queer Syrian Refugee Memoir ===
Ramadan released his memoir, Crooked Teeth, to acclaim. The memoir, focusing on the author's life as a queer boy growing up in Damascus, and a refugee in Lebanon, then his immigration to his new found home in Canada. The book was picked as a Best of the Year by Quill and Quire, was nominated for The Governor General Award, and the City of Vancouver Book Award.

== Activism ==
In a Vice Media interview in 2016, Ramadan talked about the underground work he used to do to support and sometimes house queer individuals while he lived in Damascus. He later elaborated on this experience in a 2018 interview and stated "I turned my house [in Damascus] into an underground LGBTQ centre... it was actually quite the loving community until I was arrested for it." Ramadan mentioned in a separate interview to The Media Line, that he was arrested at the airport by Syrian officials and held for six weeks. After his release, he was declared a persona non grata by the Syrian government and as a result he immigrated to Lebanon as a refugee in 2012.

Eventually, Ramadan was granted asylum in Canada, and in September 2014 he immigrated to Vancouver, British Columbia. By 2015, Ramadan already began working at Qmunity, a queer resource center in British Columbia. Around the same time Ramadan was working for Qmunity, he started volunteering for the Rainbow Refugee Society which describes itself as, "a Vancouver based community group that helps individuals seeking refugee protection in Canada based on sexual orientation, gender identity, gender expression (SOGIE) or HIV status." While volunteering at the Rainbow Refugee Society, Ramadan helped organize and support the sponsorship of Syrian refugees. Since May 2015, Ramadan has also run an annual fundraiser known as An Evening in Damascus. The goals of the fundraiser are to introduce the community to authentic Syrian culture and heritage, build a safe space for Syrian Queer and Trans refugees to celebrate their identity, offer opportunities to foster friendship and integration between Syrian Queer and Trans newcomers and LGBTQ2+ Canadian community members, and fundraise for private sponsorships. Through the fundraiser, Ramadan has raised over $150,000 for LGBTQ-identifying refugees, and he has helped 23 individuals obtain refugee protection in Canada.

Ramadan speaks publicly about issues related to gay Syrian refugees, and he has expressed his views as a speaker at conferences and conventions such as TedxSFU, Qmunity's IDAHOT Breakfast, the Liberal Party Convention, and Six Degrees Conference. Ramadan used to write a bi-weekly column for Daily Xtra between 2012 and 2016, covering topics such as what it's like to live as a refugee in another country, and how to integrate LGBTQ refugees into Canadian society.

Since November 2016, Ramadan has served as Director-at-large for the board of Vancouver Pride Society, and as of 2019, Ramadan now serves as Director for the board of the Rainbow Railroad. In 2016, Ramadan was honored as the grand marshal of the Vancouver Pride Festival for his work supporting LGBTQ-refugees and newcomers. In 2017, he was awarded the Social Activist StandOut Award by the Vancouver Pride Society for his social-activist work. That same year he was also picked as one of the 25 Top Immigrants to Canada by Canadian Immigrant. In 2018, he was a recipient of the 2018 Bonham Centre Award from the Mark S. Bonham Centre for Sexual Diversity Studies.

== Awards and honours ==
In 2025, the Library and Archives Canada announce Ramadan as one of the 2025 Canada Scholars, marking his contributions to the creation and promotion of Canada’s culture, literary heritage and historical knowledge.

The Clothesline Swing was picked among The Globe and Mail's 100 Best Books 2017 and was number 7 on the Toronto Star's "Top 10 Books of 2017".

Salma the Syrian Chef was named one of the best picture's books of 2020 by Kirkus Reviews and School Library Journal.

Awards for Ramadan's writing
Year	Title	Award	Result	Ref
2018	The Clothesline Swing	Canada Reads	Longlist	
2018	The Clothesline Swing	Fred Kerner Award for Best Overall Fiction Book	Winner	
2018	The Clothesline Swing	Forest of Reading Evergreen Award	Shortlist	
2018	The Clothesline Swing	Independent Publisher Book Award for LGBT+ Fiction	Gold	
2018	The Clothesline Swing	Lambda Literary Award for Gay Fiction	Shortlist	
2018	The Clothesline Swing	Sunburst Award for Young Adult	Longlist	
2019	Salma the Syrian Chef	Nautilus Book Award for Children's Books	Winner	
2019	Salma the Syrian Chef	Nautilus Book Award: Special Award for Best of Children's	Winner	
2020	Salma the Syrian Chef	INDIE Award for Picture Books, Early Reader	Winner	
2020	Salma the Syrian Chef	Middle East Book Award for Picture Book	Winner	
2021	Salma the Syrian Chef	ALSC Notable Children's Books	Selection	
2021	Salma the Syrian Chef	Blue Spruce Award	Finalist	
2021	Salma the Syrian Chef	Christie Harris Illustrated Children's Literature Prize	Finalist	
2021	Salma the Syrian Chef	City of Vancouver Book Award	Finalist	
2023	The Foghorn Echoes	Lambda Literary Award for Gay Fiction	Winner	
2023	The Foghorn Echoes	City of Vancouver Book Award	Finalist	
2023	The Foghorn Echoes	BC and Yukon Book Prizes - Ethel Wilson Fiction Prize	Finalist	
2024	Crooked Teeth: A Queer Syrian Refugee Memoir	Governor General's Award for English-language non-fiction	Finalist	
2024	Crooked Teeth: A Queer Syrian Refugee Memoir	City of Vancouver Book Award	Finalist	
2024	Crooked Teeth: A Queer Syrian Refugee Memoir	Quill and Quire's Book of the Year	Selection	

== Publications ==
=== Books ===
- Ramadan, Ahmad Danny (2017). The Clothesline Swing. Nightwood Editions.
- Ramadan, Ahmad Danny (2022). The Foghorn Echoes. Viking Penguin Random House.
- Ramadan, Danny (2024). Crooked Teeth: A Queer Syrian Refugee Story.

==== Salma books ====
- Ramadan, Danny (2020). Salma the Syrian Chef. Illustrated by Anna Bron. Annick Press.
- Ramadan, Danny (2023). Salma Makes a Home. Illustrated by Anna Bron. Annick Press.
- Ramadan, Danny (2023). Salma Writes a Book. Illustrated by Anna Bron. Annick Press.
- Ramadan, Danny (2024). Salma Joins the Team. Illustrated by Anna Bron. Annick Press.

=== Essays ===
- Ramadan, Danny (2016). Sharman, Zena (ed.). The Remedy: Queer and Trans Voices on Health and Healthcare. Arsenal Pulp Press.
- Ramadan, Ahmed Danny (Spring–Summer 2016). "Searching for a home : one man's story of survival in the Syrian civil war". Journal of International Affairs. 69 (2): 185–189. Archived from the original on April 23, 2022.
- Ramadan, Danny (2021). "Speak my Tongue". In Fantetti, Eufemia; Carranza, Leonarda; Tsabari, Ayelet (eds.). Tongues: On Longing and Belonging Through Language. CELA.
- Ramadan, Danny (2022). "A Portrait of the Author as a Marginalized Man". In Jahshan, Elias (ed.). This Arab Is Queer. Saqi Books.

=== Short story collections ===
- Ramadan, Ahmad Danny (2004). Death and Other Fools (in Arabic). Laila.
- Ramadan, Ahmad Danny (2008). Arya (in Arabic). Malameh.

=== Translations ===
- Badawi, Rafi (2015). Schreiber, Constantin (ed.). 1000 Lashes: Because I Say What I Think. Translated by Ramadan, Ahmed Danny. Greystone Books.
