= Khalid Abdel-Hadi =

Jordanian LGBTQ rights activist and model (born 1988/89)

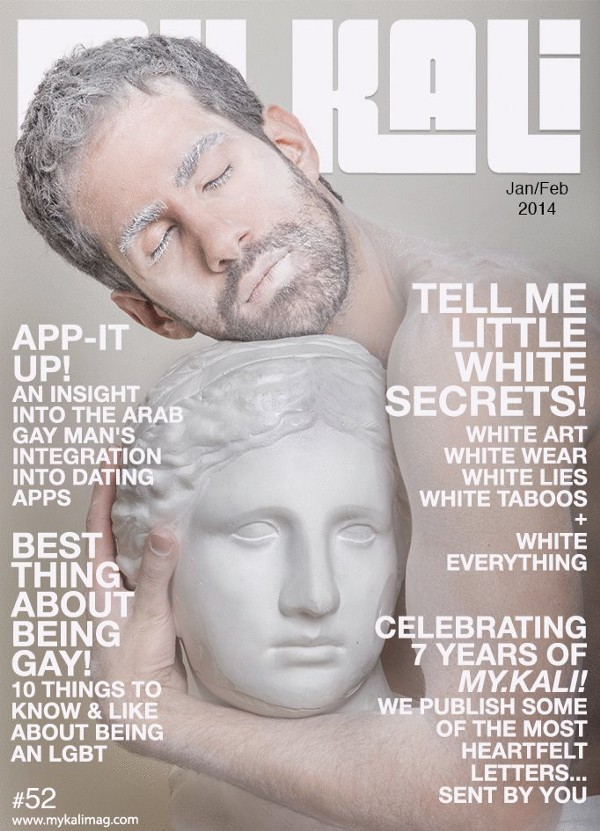
- Abdel-Hadi on the February 2014 cover of My Kali
- Born: 1988 or 1989 (age 37–38); Amman, Jordan

Khalid Abdel-Hadi (born 1988 or 1989) is a Jordanian LGBT rights activist and model, best known for founding My.Kali, the first LGBT magazine in the Middle East. Abdel-Hadi was listed as one of The Guardian's "LGBT change heroes of 2017".

== Early life and education ==
Abdel-Hadi was born and raised in Amman, Jordan. His family has Palestinian and Kurdish-Turkish roots. Abdel-Hadi was bullied at school for acting feminine. He came out to his mother at age 14, telling her he liked men; she told him he was "just yearning for a father figure".

He graduated from the University of Petra in 2014.

== My.Kali ==
Abdel-Hadi was interested in magazines since childhood. He had attempted to intern at local publications, but was turned down for being "too out there". In 2007, at age 17, he decided to found My Kali with some of his friends, with the aim of providing LGBT-related content. On 30 October 2007, a local Jordanian publication, Ammon News, reported on its launch, reprinting My Kali's cover image of a shirtless Abdel-Hadi, though it identified him only as a "gay Jordanian teen". This article was referenced by numerous publications, outing Abdel-Hadi. At the time, Abdel-Hadi feared for his life. Abdel-Hadi recounted this event for the 2022 anthology, This Arab Is Queer.

== Art ==
In 2022, Abdel-Hadi co-curated Habibi, Les Révolutions de l’Amour, an exhibition of LGBT artists from the Arab world and diaspora, at the Institut du Monde Arabe in Paris.

== Modeling ==
Abdel-Hadi often collaborates with photographers and artists. In November 2017, for example, he was a subject for French photographer Scarlett Coten's series of portraits entitled "Mectoub" of young men from Middle Eastern countries. Coten photographed Abdel-Hadi wearing a black high-waist swimsuit and heels.

In 2011, Abdel-Hadi angered many conservative LGBTQ Muslims by posing for a photoshoot in a speedo on Rainbow Street, Amman, with a mosque in the background. He later published a public apology for the shoot in Gay Star News.

== Personal life ==
Abdel-Hadi is gay and queer. He is also Muslim.

He rarely makes media appearances outside his own publication and those of people who are close to him, and has said he dislikes being the center of attention and speaking in front of crowds.
