= Ahmed Umar (artist) =

Sudanese-Norwegian LGBT activist (born 1988)

- أحمد عمر
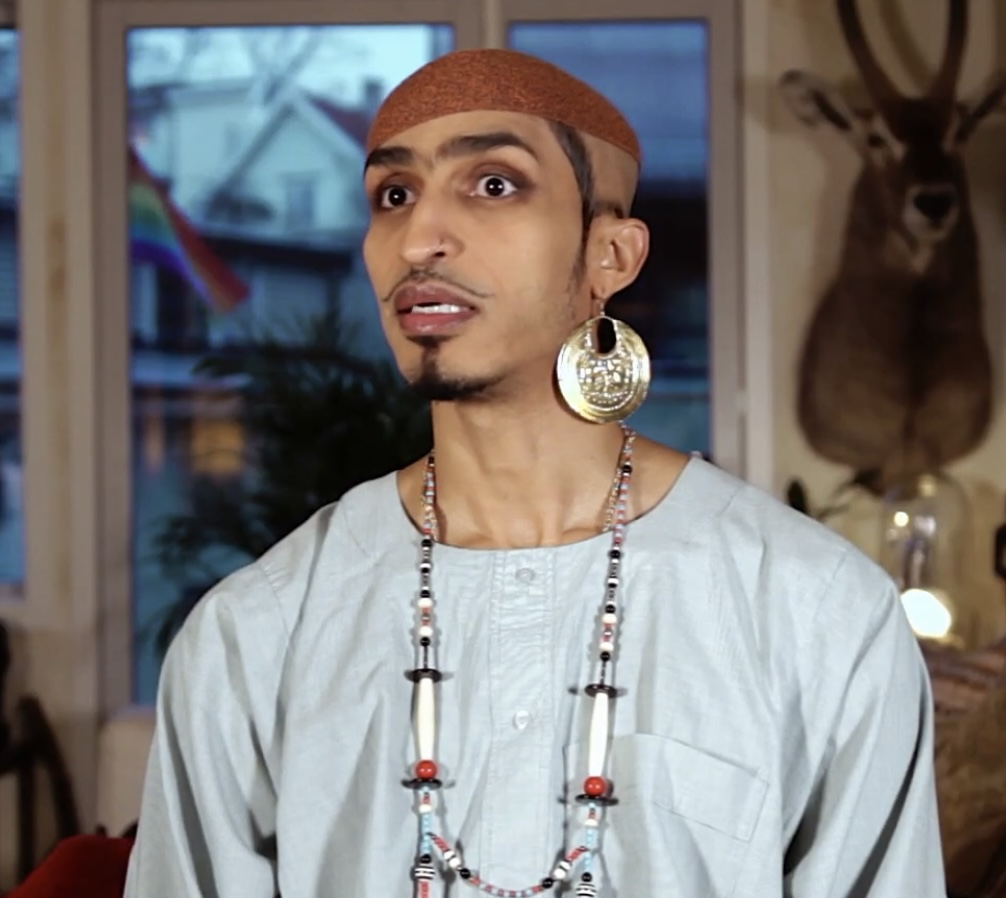
- Ahmed Umar during an interview in 2021
- Born: Ahmed Siddig Umar; 10 February 1988 (age 38)
- Citizenship: Sudan; Norway
- Notable work: The Art of Sin; This Arab Is Queer; Carrying the face of ugliness The Nile Pride 2030
- Website: www.ahmedumar.com

Ahmed Umar (Arabic: أحمد عمر, born 10 February 1988) is a Sudanese-Norwegian visual artist and LGBT activist. He (Note: Umar uses he/him, she/her, and they/them pronouns. This article uses he/him for editorial consistency.) grew up in a conservative family in Sudan and later fled to Norway. His artwork mixes Sudanese (e.g., the Black Pharaohs of the ancient Kingdom of Kush) and Western influences. He was profiled in the 2020 documentary The Art of Sin.

== Life and career ==
=== Early life ===
Ahmed Umar was born in Sudan on 10 February 1988, to Siddig and Zeinab Umar, the youngest of five siblings. His family was a traditional Sufi family that lived between Mecca and Sudan.

Umar was educated in Mecca and first began to fall in love with other boys whilst living there. He later went on to study in Sudan and entered into a "halal relationship" with a woman, though his feelings for men continued.

=== Moving to Norway ===
Umar arrived in Norway in 2008 as a political refugee from Sudan on the basis of his sexuality, which at the time was one of seven nations that legally enshrined the death penalty for homosexuality. He obtained a bachelor’s degree in Printmaking 2014 from Oslo National Academy of the Arts, followed by a master’s degree in Fine Art.

While in Norway, he became an artist known for mixing Sudanese and Western influences in the medium of live performances, work with ceramics, jewellery, and prints. His work has since been exhibited at various national and international institutes.

== Art and LGBT activism ==
In 2015, Umar came out as gay on Facebook. This caused many of the Sudanese community to turn against him, including members of his family. He later said of this experience:

I believed that I was cursed and that Allah would punish me with eternal unhappiness, HIV and die like Freddie Mercury, and that I will bring shame to my family. I wanted so badly to die. I was so lonely.

His coming out was profiled in the 2020 film The Art of Sin. In 2022, he contributed a chapter entitled Pilgrimage of Love to an anthology entitled This Arab Is Queer. In an interview with 500 Words Magazine, he discussed his belief that there were entirely homosexual groups of men living in the Kingdom of Kush, challenging Sudan's deep-rooted homophobia.

=== Islam in Umar's work ===
Umar is an atheist but Islam and Arabic culture are major themes in his work. Many of his sculptures were inspired by the Qur'an, such as Would any of you like to eat a dead brothers flesh?,' (Arabic: أَيُحِبُّ أَحَدُكُمْ أَنْ يَأْكُلَ لَحْمَ أَخِيهِ مَيْتًا فَكَرِهْتُمُوهُ) which originates from Quran Chapter 49:12, and What Lasts! (Arabic: ماذا تبقا) which describes the story of Lot. Umar's 2016 'Purification set' sculpture shows the tools used for Wudu.

Umar's jewellery work Hijab (Arabic: حجاب) navigates the strong link between religion amulets and superstition by stringing together a 365-bead amulet, one for every day of the year, to protect the wearer from harm and bring luck in the Sufi tradition.

=== Sudan in Umar's work ===
Umar's work embraces Sudanese culture and themes. If you no longer have a family, make your own with clay (Arabic: الماعنده أهل, يعمل أهل من طين), is named for a Sudanese proverb and deals with Umar's family disowning him after his coming out. In 2018, Umar became a naturalised Norwegian citizen and attended the citizenship ceremony wearing an outfit that combined Sudanese and Norwegian cultures.

==== Carrying the face of ugliness ====
Umar became widely known as the face of the Sudanese LGBT community, while animosity towards him also grew. In 2020, while filming The Art of Sin, he compiled a series of photographs of various members of the LGBT community in Sudan, then added his face on top of theirs. He titled this series Carrying the face of ugliness (Arabic: شايل وش القباحة) after a Sudanese phrase which refers to someone who does something unfamiliar, confronts an issue and takes the blame for it. These photos were later displayed as street art around Oslo.

==== Sudanese Revolution ====
Support of the Sudanese Revolution is a major theme in Umar's work. In June 2019, Umar joined NYC Pride March wearing a Sudanese-inspired outfit. He also shared his hopes to "live freely in a democratic nation where everyone is valued equally". In 2020, during the Agenda arts and crafts event organised by Oslo National Academy of the Arts, Umar showcased his artworks relating to the relationship between art and democracy in the context of Sudan and its 30 years dictatorship. In 2021, the In God's hand photo project depicted the revolutionary women of Sudan, The Kandakas.

==== The Nile Pride 2030 ====
The Nile Pride 2030 عِزّة النيل event poster.

Umar is convinced that there will be a Pride parade in Sudan before he dies, an occasion he considers as important as Christmas or Eid. He actively promotes The Nile Pride (Arabic: عِزّة النيل), a festival planned to take place in Khartoum in 2030.

== Work and exhibitions ==
=== Selected work ===
- Kunsten a være syndig (2017) - short documentary film.
- If you no longer have a family, make your own with clay (Arabic: الماعنده أهل, يعمل أهل من طين), Last Frontier art space, NYC, US. (2019)
- The Art of Sin (Arabic: فن الخطيئة) a documentary film. (2020)
- In God's hand, Ha Gamle Prestegard, Oslo. (2022)
- Solace in Clay, International Academy of Ceramics, UN, Geneva. (2022)
- Glowing Phalanges: Prayer Beads 99, (planned) Kunstnernes Hus, Oslo. (2023)

=== Selected public collections ===
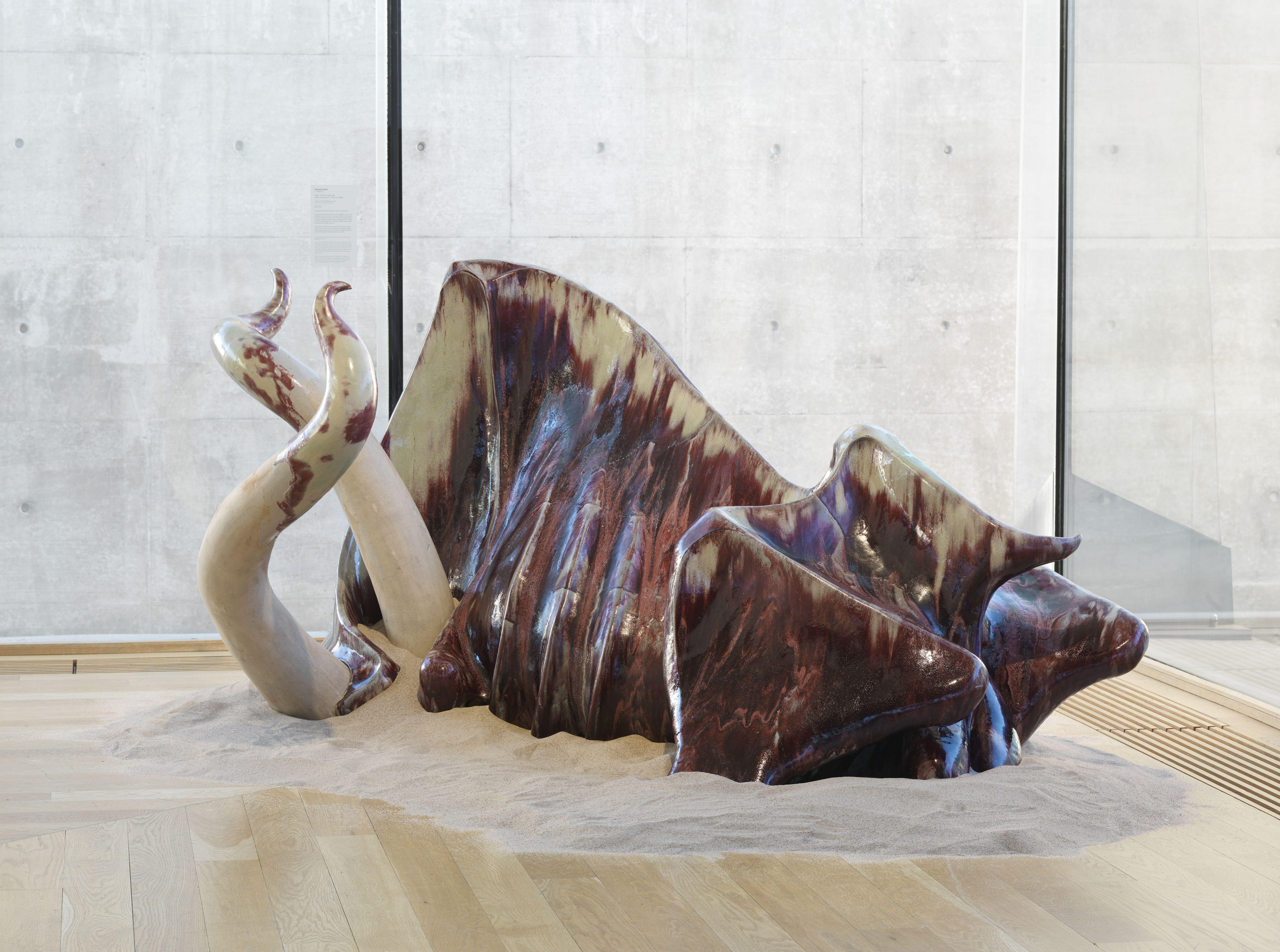
Sculpture Thawr, Thawra (Arabic: ثورة, ثورة) at the Norwegian National Museum, Oslo

- Hijab (Annual Protection, Arabic: حجاب), Oslo Municipality Art Collection. (2017)
- Thawr, Thawra (Arabic: ثورة, ثورة), The Norwegian National Museum, Oslo. (2019)
- Hijab to Hannah (Arabic: من الحجاب للحنة), National Museum of Decorative Arts, Trondheim. (2019)
- Forbidden Prayer: The Norwegian Ministry of Foreign Affairs (An installation for the embassy of Norway in Khartoum, Sudan). (2020)
- What Lasts! (Arabic: ماذا تبقا، Sarcophagus), Vestfossen Kunstlaboratorium. (2021)

== Awards and honours ==
2016: The Art Student Grant from BKH, The Norwegian Relief Fund for Visual Artists

2017: Debutante Award, Kunsthånverk, Norske kunst og hånverkers Årsutstilling, National Museum of Decorative Arts, Trondheim

=== 2018 ===
- Young and newly established artist's work grant, Arts Council Norway
- Atelier Kunstnerforbundet Studio residency
- NOoSPHERE Artist Residency Award, New York City
- Scheibler Foundation Art and Craft Award

=== 2021 ===
- KunstnerLiv documentary show, NRK
- Nominee for Sandefjord Kunstforening Art Award
- Artist's work grant, Arts Council Norway

== See also ==
- Human rights in Sudan
- LGBT rights in Sudan
