= Hasan Namir =

Iraqi-Canadian writer (born 1987)

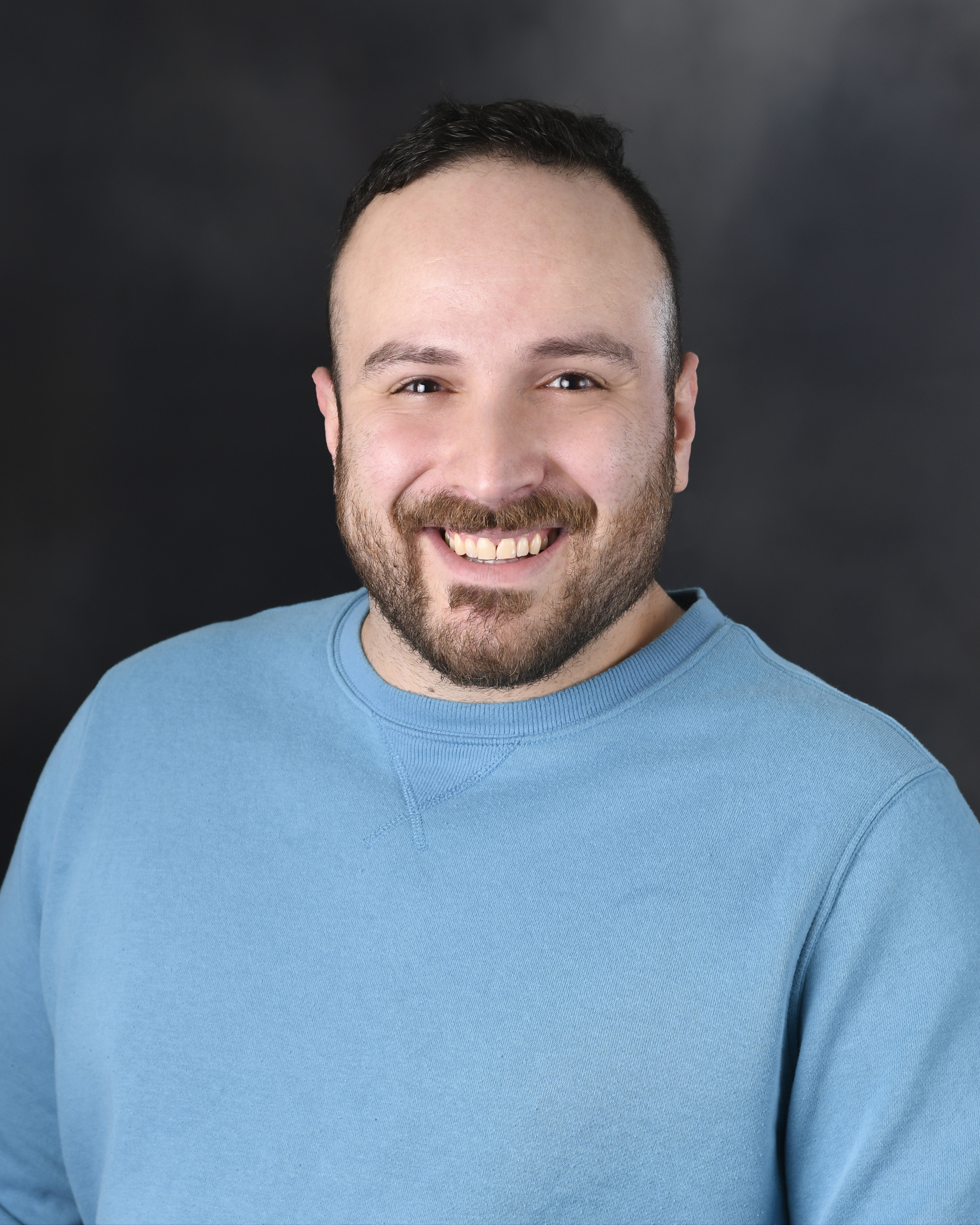
- Born: 1987 (age 38–39); Iraq
- Occupation: writer
- Writing career
- Genres: fiction, poetry & picture books

Hasan Namir is an Iraqi-Canadian writer.

Born in Iraq in 1987, Namir moved to Canada with his family at age 11. He is a graduate of Simon Fraser University, and lives in Vancouver, British Columbia. God in Pink, a novel about a gay man living in Baghdad during the Iraq War, was published by Arsenal Pulp Press in 2015. The book won the 2016 Lambda Literary Award for Gay Fiction. In 2019, he was named one of "19 Canadian writers to watch in 2019" by the CBC.

His poetry book War / Torn was released on April 10, 2019, and was shortlisted for a Stonewall Book Award in 2020.

His work has also been featured on Huffington Post, Shaw TV, Airbnb, in the film God in Pink: A Documentary, Breakfast Television Toronto, CTV Morning Live Saskatoon.

He is also the author of children’s book The Name I Call Myself (Arsenal Pulp Press, 2020), and the poetry collection Umbilical Cord (Book*Hug Press, 2021). His latest picture book, Banana Dream (Neal Pooks, 2023) is about a young boy who dreams about the taste of bananas, and was inspired by Namir’s own childhood.
