= Saleem Haddad =

Writer

- سليم حداد
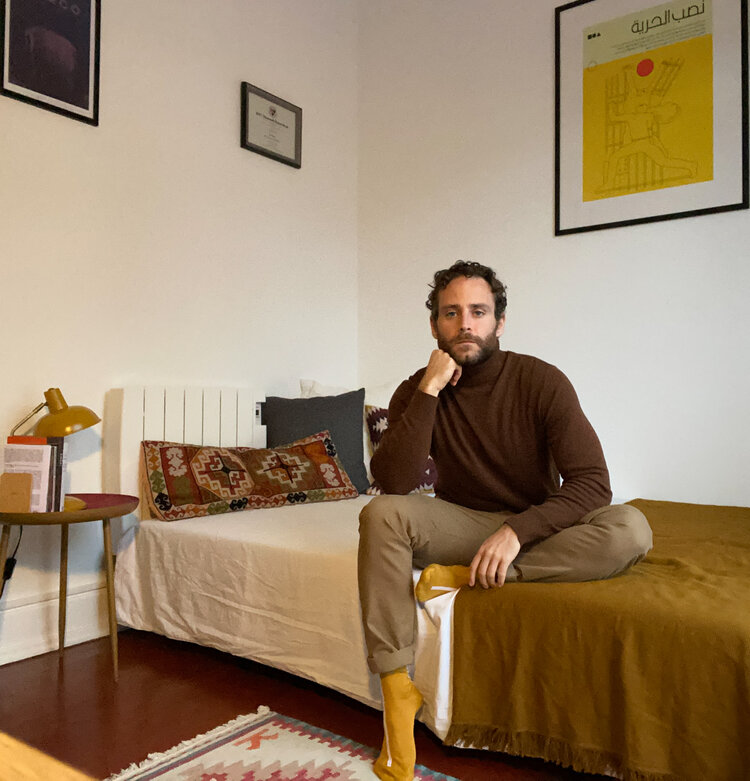
- Born: Saleem Yacoub Saleem Haddad; 1983 (age 42–43); Kuwait City, Kuwait
- Notable work: Guapa
- Website: saleemhaddad.com

Saleem Yacoub Saleem Haddad (Arabic: سليم حداد; born 1983) is a queer Arab author, filmmaker and aid worker of Iraqi-German and Palestinian-Lebanese descent, His debut novel Guapa (2016), which explores the life of a gay man in an unnamed Arab country, received critical acclaim. Haddad has also written on LGBTQ+ issues in the Middle East and contributed to the anthology This Arab is Queer (2022).

== Early life ==
Saleem Haddad was born in Kuwait City in 1983 to a Palestinian father who was born and raised in Lebanon and an Iraqi-German mother. His Palestinian Christian grandmother was born in Nazareth and lived in Haifa before being displaced to Beirut during the Nakba. His parents met in Baghdad during the Lebanese Civil War, and moved to Kuwait during the Iran–Iraq War. After Haddad's birth, during the Gulf War, the family moved again to Cyprus. Haddad was subsequently raised and educated in Amman and London. He studied economics at Queen's University at Kingston, Ontario in Canada.

== Books ==
Haddad's debut novel Guapa was released in March 2016 by Other Press. The book, set over 24 hours, tells the story of Rasa, a gay man living in an unnamed Arab country, and trying to carve out a life for himself in the midst of political and religious upheaval.

The novel was excerpted by VICE as well as Kalimat magazine, and received widespread acclaim, with The New Yorker calling it a "vibrant, wrenching début novel". According to Book Riot, "Haddad maps postcolonial theory, post-revolutionary malaise, and post-outing upheaval onto your standard post-college, what-am-I-doing-with-my-life aimlessness, creating something wonderful and fascinating in the process."

As part of the London Literature Festival, Haddad was awarded the Polari First Book Prize 2017. The prize is awarded annually to a writer whose first book explores the LGBT experience, whether in poetry, prose, fiction or non-fiction.

In February 2026, his second novel Floodlines was published by Europa Editions. This book is set over several decades and follows multiple family members as they grapple with their family's complex legacy and history in Iraq. Grief, art, cultural legacy and memory are main themes.

== Other work ==
Haddad's work has also appeared in Slate and Muftah. He has also worked as an aid worker with Doctors Without Borders and other organizations in Yemen, Syria, and Iraq. He currently lives in Lisbon with his partner.

In 2018 Haddad wrote and directed his first short film, Marco. The film had its World Premiere at Mawjoudin Queer Film Festival in Tunis, and its European Premiere at BFI Flare: London LGBT Film Festival in London, both in March 2019. The film subsequently screened internationally at festivals including Palm Springs International ShortFest and Outfest Fusion, and was nominated for Best British Short at the 2019 Iris Prize. In April 2020, the film was made available on YouTube.

Haddad contributed to the anthology This Arab is Queer (2022).
