= LGBTQ rights in Sudan =

- Sudan
- Legal status: Illegal since 1991
- Penalty: Min.: 5 years (1st offence); Max.: life imprisonment (3rd offence)
- Military: No
- Discrimination protections: No

Family rights
- Recognition of relationships: No recognition of same-sex unions
- Adoption: No

Lesbian, gay, bisexual, transgender, and queer (LGBTQ) people in Sudan face significant challenges not experienced by non-LGBTQ residents. Same-sex sexual activity in Sudan is illegal for both men and women, while homophobic attitudes remain ingrained throughout the nation.

In July 2020, Sudan removed capital punishment for same-sex sexual activity, as well as corporal punishment. Sodomy remains illegal, and penalties of terms of imprisonment were retained. The maximum penalty, for a third offence, remains life imprisonment.

== Law regarding anal sex ==
Sodomy, defined as anal sex whether the couple is same-sex or opposite-sex, is illegal in Sudan. The Offence is defined in Article 148 of the Criminal Act of 1991. The original wording (translated) of the sodomy law, as amended in 2009, follows:

(1)There shall be deemed to commit sodomy, every man who penetrates his glans, or the equivalent thereof, in the anus of a woman, or another man's, or permits another man to penetrate his glans, or its equivalent in his anus.
(2) (a) whoever commits the offence of sodomy, shall be punished, with shipping a hundred lashes, and he may also be punished, with imprisonment, for a term not exceeding five years;
(b) where the offender is convicted for the second time, he shall be punished, with whipping a hundred lashes, and with imprisonment, for a term, not exceeding five years;
(c) where the offender is convicted for the third time he shall be punished, with death, or with life imprisonment.

— Article 148: Offence of sodomy, 1991 Criminal Act as Amended in 2009

There were no documented cases of executions for sodomy, prior to repeal of capital punishment for the offence.

On 9 July 2020, Sudan abolished the death penalty as a punishment for anal sex. The Transitional Sovereignty Council also eliminated the imposition of 100 lashes and added two years to the sentence for a second offence. The penalty for a third offence was changed from death or life imprisonment to life imprisonment. A first offence is now punished with up to five years and a second offence with up to seven years. Sudanese LGBTQ activists hailed the reform as a 'great first step' but said it was not enough yet, and the end goal should be the decriminalisation of gay sexual activity altogether.

== Historically ==
=== Nuba tribal society in the 1930s ===
Siegfried Frederick Nadel wrote about the Nuba tribes in the late 1930s. He noted that among the Otoro, a special transvestitic role existed whereby men dressed and lived as women. Transvestitic homosexuality also existed amongst the Moru, Nyima, and Tira people, and reported marriages of Korongo londo and Mesakin tubele for the bride price of one goat.

In the Korongo and Mesakin tribes, Nadel reported a common reluctance among men to abandon all-male camp life for a life of permanent settlement. While not directly attributing the observed preference for camp life, Nadel highlighted two features of tribal life, as he viewed them, in connection with the preference: that it was a "matrilineal society ... in which the fruits of procreation are not the man's", and "the strong emphasis on male companionship, ... [and] also, ... widespread homosexuality and transvesticism."

== Politics regarding LGBTQ rights ==
On 4 February 2011 a vote was held in the United Nations on the International Lesbian, Gay, Bisexual, Trans and Intersex Association's application for consultative status for the UN's Economic and Social Council. Sudan called for a No Action Motion to prevent voting on the consultative status for the LGBTQ group, and their motion passed 9–7, so the issue was not voted on.

Sudan has voted against every supportive resolution of LGBTQ rights at the United Nations.

== Social attitudes ==
Same-sex sexual relations policies have divided some religious communities. In 2006, Abraham Mayom Athiaan, a bishop in South Sudan, led a split from the Episcopal Church of Sudan for what he regarded as a failure by the church leadership to condemn homosexuality sufficiently strongly.

The U.S. Department of State's 2011 human rights report found that:

The law prohibits sodomy ...; however, there were no reports of antisodomy laws being applied. There were no known lesbian, gay, bisexual, or transgender (LGBT) organizations. Official discrimination based on sexual orientation and gender identity occurred. Societal discrimination against LGBT persons was widespread. Vigilantes targeted suspected gay men and lesbians for violent abuse, and there were public demonstrations against homosexuality.

In the 2019 Arab Barometer Survey, 17% of Sudanese said homosexuality is acceptable.

=== Rights groups ===
The first LGBTQ association of the country is Freedom Sudan, founded in December 2006. However, no internet presence has been seen from the group's Facebook page since 2013. Another group, Rainbow Sudan, was founded on 9 February 2012. Its founder, known as Mohammed, described the work and aims of the group: "...[W]e have groups that work online and offline. We form a small network of people working in an organized way to advance as much as possible LGBTQ issues, to show who we are, to stop discrimination, to see our rights recognized. We provide sexual education, psychological and emotional support, protection." Rainbow Sudan's internet presence ceased after January 2015. Bedayaa, founded in 2010, continues to serve the LGBT+ community in Nile valley region of Sudan and Egypt.

== Summary table ==
Same-sex sexual activity legal	No (Sodomy, defined as anal sex, whether between persons of same- or different-sex, carries life imprisonment for a third offence)
Equal age of consent	No
Anti-discrimination laws in employment only	No
Anti-discrimination laws in the provision of goods and services	No
Anti-discrimination laws in all other areas (incl. indirect discrimination, hate speech)	No
Same-sex marriages	No
Recognition of same-sex couples	No
Stepchild adoption by same-sex couples	No
Joint adoption by same-sex couples	No
LGBTQ people allowed to serve openly in the military	No
Right to change legal gender	No
Access to IVF for lesbians	No
Commercial surrogacy for gay male couples	No
MSMs allowed to donate blood	No

== See also ==
- Human rights in Sudan
- LGBTQ rights in Africa
