= Bani Zeid al-Sharqiya =

- Municipality type C

Arabic transcription(s)
  - Arabic: بني زيد الشرقية
  - Latin: Bani Zeid East (official); Bani Zayd ash-Sharqiyya (unofficial)
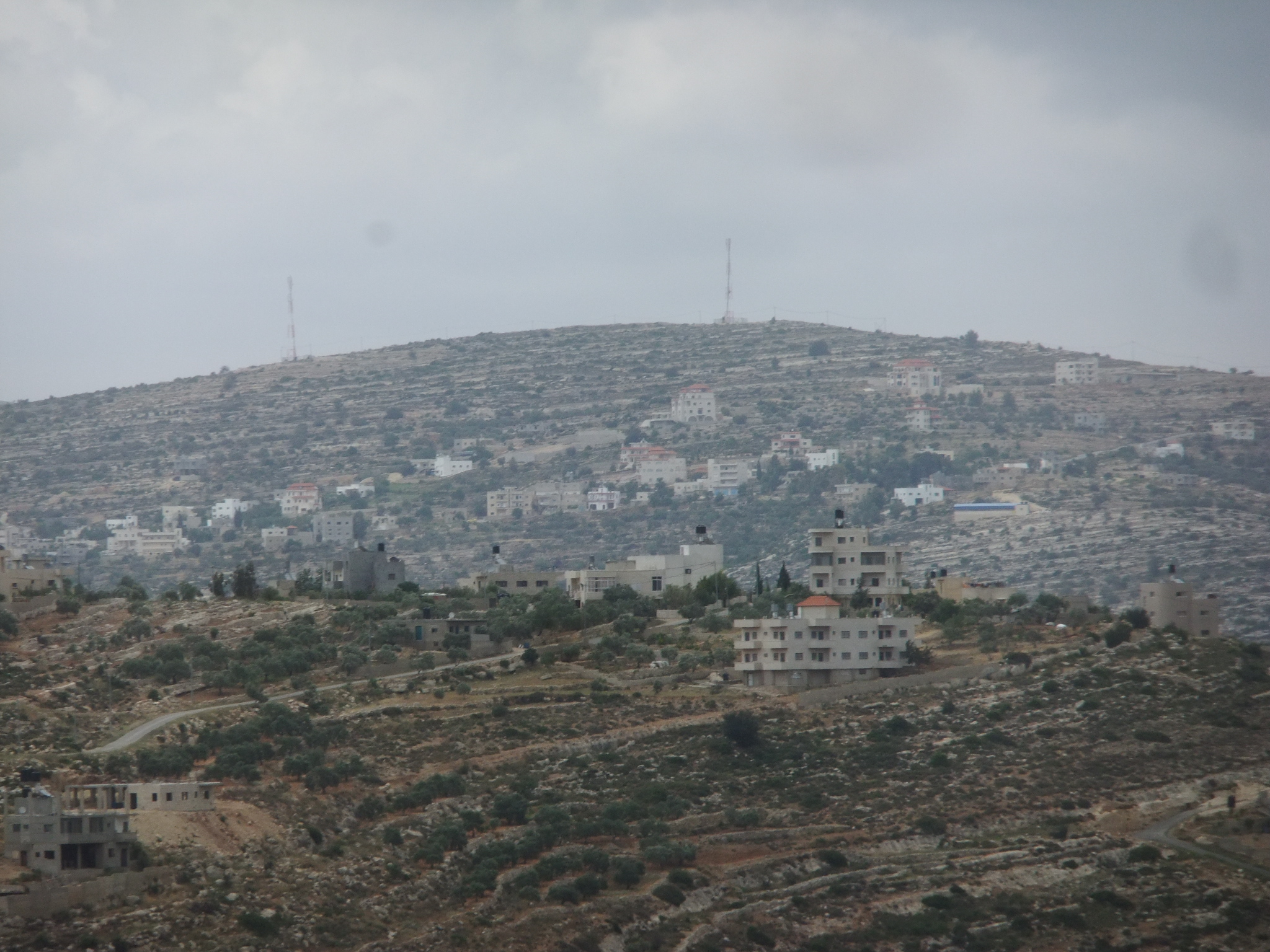
- Arura, in the distance

- Location of Bani Zeid al-Sharqiya within Palestine
- Coordinates: 32°02′N 35°10′E
- Palestine grid: 165/161, 166/161
- State: State of Palestine
- Governorate: Ramallah and al-Bireh

Government
  - Type: Municipality
  - Head of Municipality: Abd al-Rahman al-Nubani

Population (2007)
  - Total: 5,083
- Name meaning: "Eastern Bani Zeid"

Bani Zeid al-Sharqiya (Arabic: بني زيد الشرقية) is a Palestinian town in the northern West Bank, located north of Ramallah in the Ramallah and al-Bireh Governorate. It was formed as a result of a merger of the villages of 'Arura, Mazari al-Nubani, and Abwein, although the latter separated from the municipality. Bani Zeid al-Sharqiya is 3 kilometers (1.9 mi) north of Ajjul and other nearby localities include Deir as-Sudan to the southeast, Kafr Ein to the east, and Abwein to the southwest.

== History ==
Both Arura and Mazari al-Nubani were part of the Bani Zeid subdistrict in the Sanjak of Jerusalem. The two villages produced 99 qintars of olive oil, which was the chief agricultural product. Adult males were taxed 649 akçe.

=== 'Arura ===
'Arura (Arabic: عاروره, ‘Arūrā) 32°02′30″N 35°10′18″E (Palestine grid 166/160) is situated 500 meters (1,600 ft) above sea level.

==== History ====
Pottery sherds from the IA I, IA II, Persian, Hellenistic, Roman, Byzantine and Crusader/Ayyubid eras have been found here.

Shrines dedicated to Sheikh Radwan, Sheikh Ahmad, and al-Khidr are located in the area. Al-Khidr's shrine, in the center of the village, has no relation to al-Khidr, and commemorates a holy man with the same name. Sheikh Ahmad's shrine is to the west of 'Arura.

The Shrine of Sheikh Radwan bin 'Ulayl al-Arsufi, built during the Ayyubid rule of interior Palestine, is located southwest of the village on a hill roughly 600 meters (2,000 ft) above sea level. Not much is known about Radwan, except that he was a revered figure who died in Egypt and was transferred to 'Arura for burial. An Arabic inscription written in typical rural Ayyubid style, reads that he was transferred to "blessed Syria." A mosque was constructed adjacent to the shrine.

Pottery sherds from the Mamluk era have also been found here.

===== Ottoman era =====
In 1596 'Arura appeared in the Ottoman tax registers as being in the Nahiya of Quds of the Liwa of Quds. It had a population of 62 households, all Muslim, who paid a fixed tax rate of 33,3% on agricultural products, including on wheat, barley, olive trees, vineyards and fruit trees, goats and/or beehives; a total of 12,000 akçe. 1/6 of the revenue went to a Waqf.

In 1838 'Arurah was noted as a Muslim village, part of the Beni Zeid area, located north of Jerusalem.

Victor Guérin visited the village in the late 19th century and found 350-400 inhabitants. He also observed fragments of columns and other indications of an ancient town. There were also threshing-floors which appeared ancient.

Socin found an official Ottoman village list from 1870 attesting to 91 houses and a population of 300, although only men were counted.

In 1882, the PEF's Survey of Western Palestine described Arara as being a small village on high ground remarkable for having five sacred places on the west side of the village.

In 1896, Arura was estimated to have a combined population of 540.

===== British Mandate era =====
In the 1922 census of Palestine conducted by the British Mandate authorities, 'Arura had a population of 426 Muslims, increasing in the 1931 census to 566 Muslim, in 131 houses.

The 1945 statistics found 660 Muslim inhabitants, with a total land area of 10,978 dunams. Of this, 7,095 were used for plantations and irrigable land, 787 for cereals, while 26 dunams were classified as built-up areas.

===== Jordanian era =====
In the wake of the 1948 Arab–Israeli War, and after the 1949 Armistice Agreements, 'Arura came under Jordanian rule.

In 1961, the population of 'Arura was 1,337.

===== Post 1967 =====
Since the Six-Day War in 1967, 'Arura has been under Israeli occupation.

There was a sharp decrease in the population from 1961 to 1982, with nearly half the inhabitants fleeing in 1967. In 1997, 'Arura had a population of 2,087, of whom 30 (1.4%) were Palestinian refugees. The gender make-up was 1,069 males and 1,018 females. According to the Palestinian Central Bureau of Statistics, it had a population of approximately 2,967 in mid-year 2006.

=== Mazari al-Nubani ===
Mazari al-Nubani (Arabic: مزارع النوباني) 32°02′58″N 35°09′57″E, (Palestine grid 165/161) is situated along the same height as 'Arura.

==== History ====
Mazari al-Nubani was identified by Röhricht, Prawer and Benvenisti) as a Crusader village called Mezera, but Finkelstein et al. disputes this.

===== Ottoman era =====
In 1596 Mazra'at al-'Abbas appeared in the Ottoman tax registers as being in the Nahiya of Quds of the Liwa of Quds. It had a population of 60 households and 21 bachelors, all Muslim. Taxes were paid on wheat, barley, olive trees, vineyards and fruit trees, goats and/or beehives; a total of 6,910 akçe. 1/3 of the revenue went to a Waqf.

In 1838 el-Mezari'a was noted as a Muslim village, part of the Beni Zeid area, located north of Jerusalem.

When Guérin passed by the village in 1870, he estimated it had a population of about 600. An Ottoman village list from the same year showed Mazari with a population of 560, in 163 houses, though the population count included men only. It was also noted it was located east of Qarawat Bani Zeid.

In 1882, the PEF's Survey of Western Palestine described the village, then called Mezrah, as being of moderate size, on high ground.

In 1896 the population of Mezra‘a was estimated to be about 1,008 persons.

===== British Mandate era =====
In the 1922 census of Palestine conducted by the British Mandate authorities, Mazarie' al-Nubani had a population of 611 Muslims, increasing in the 1931 census to 864 Muslims, in 193 houses.

The 1945 statistics found 1,090 Muslim inhabitants with a total of 9,631 dunam of land. Of this, 7,399 were used for plantations and irrigable land, 445 for cereals, while 59 dunams were classified as built-up areas.

===== Jordanian era =====
In the wake of the 1948 Arab–Israeli War, and after the 1949 Armistice Agreements, Mazari Nubani came under Jordanian rule.

In 1961, the population of Mazari al-Nubani was 1,358.

===== Post 1967 =====
Since the Six-Day War in 1967, Mazari al-Nuban has been under Israeli occupation.

According to the Palestinian Central Bureau of Statistics (PCBS), the town had a population of approximately 2,510 inhabitants in mid-year 2006.

== Local government ==
The municipality was formed after a merger of 'Arura, Mazari al-Nubani, and Abwein prior to the Palestinian municipal elections in 2005. During the elections, Fatima Taher Sihweil from Abwein won and the municipality fell apart with only 'Arura and Mazari al-Nubani remaining.

The municipality separated in 2020.

== Bibliography ==
- Barron, J. B., ed. (1923). Palestine: Report and General Abstracts of the Census of 1922. Government of Palestine.
- Conder, C.R.; Kitchener, H.H. (1882). The Survey of Western Palestine: Memoirs of the Topography, Orography, Hydrography, and Archaeology. Vol. 2. London: Committee of the Palestine Exploration Fund.
- Dauphin, C. (1998). La Palestine byzantine, Peuplement et Populations. BAR International Series 726 (in French). Vol. III : Catalogue. Oxford: Archeopress. ISBN 0-860549-05-4.
- Finkelstein, I.; Lederman, Zvi, eds. (1997). Highlands of many cultures. Tel Aviv: Institute of Archaeology of Tel Aviv University Publications Section. ISBN 965-440-007-3.
- Government of Jordan, Department of Statistics (1964). First Census of Population and Housing. Volume I: Final Tables; General Characteristics of the Population (PDF).
- Government of Palestine, Department of Statistics (1945). Village Statistics, April, 1945.
- Guérin, V. (1875). Description Géographique Historique et Archéologique de la Palestine (in French). Vol. 2: Samarie, pt. 2. Paris: L'Imprimerie Nationale.
- Hadawi, S. (1970). Village Statistics of 1945: A Classification of Land and Area ownership in Palestine. Palestine Liberation Organization Research Centre.
- Hartmann, M. (1883). "Die Ortschaftenliste des Liwa Jerusalem in dem türkischen Staatskalender für Syrien auf das Jahr 1288 der Flucht (1871)". Zeitschrift des Deutschen Palästina-Vereins. 6: 102–149.
- Hütteroth, Wolf-Dieter; Abdulfattah, Kamal (1977). Historical Geography of Palestine, Transjordan and Southern Syria in the Late 16th Century. Erlanger Geographische Arbeiten, Sonderband 5. Erlangen, Germany: Vorstand der Fränkischen Geographischen Gesellschaft. ISBN 3-920405-41-2.
- Mills, E., ed. (1932). Census of Palestine 1931. Population of Villages, Towns and Administrative Areas. Jerusalem: Government of Palestine.
- Moudjir ed-dyn (1876). Sauvaire (ed.). Histoire de Jérusalem et d'Hébron depuis Abraham jusqu'à la fin du XVe siècle de J.-C. : fragments de la Chronique de Moudjir-ed-dyn.
- Palmer, E.H. (1881). The Survey of Western Palestine: Arabic and English Name Lists Collected During the Survey by Lieutenants Conder and Kitchener, R. E. Transliterated and Explained by E.H. Palmer. Committee of the Palestine Exploration Fund.
- Prawer, J.; Benvenisti, D. (1970). Palestine under the Crusaders. In: Amiran, D.H.K. et al., eds. Atlas of Israel. Vol. IX: 10. Jerusalem.
- Robinson, E.; Smith, E. (1841). Biblical Researches in Palestine, Mount Sinai and Arabia Petraea: A Journal of Travels in the year 1838. Vol. 3. Boston: Crocker & Brewster.
- Röhricht, R. (1887). "Studien zur mittelalterlichen Geographie und Topographie Syriens". Zeitschrift des Deutschen Palästina-Vereins. 10: 195–344.
- Schick, C. (1896). "Zur Einwohnerzahl des Bezirks Jerusalem". Zeitschrift des Deutschen Palästina-Vereins. 19: 120–127.
- Sharon, M. (1997). Corpus Inscriptionum Arabicarum Palaestinae, A. Vol. 1. BRILL. ISBN 90-04-10833-5.
- Singer, A. (1994). Palestinian Peasants and Ottoman Officials: Rural Administration Around Sixteenth-Century Jerusalem. Cambridge University Press. ISBN 0-521-47679-8.
- Socin, A. (1879). "Alphabetisches Verzeichniss von Ortschaften des Paschalik Jerusalem". Zeitschrift des Deutschen Palästina-Vereins. 2: 135–163.
- Tamārī, S. (2008). Mountain Against the Sea: Essays on Palestinian Society and Culture. University of California Press. ISBN 978-0-520-25129-8.
- Toledano, E. (1984). "The Sanjaq of Jerusalem in the Sixteenth Century: Aspects of Topography and Population". Archivum Ottomanicum. 9: 279–319. Archived from the original on 2016-03-05.
