= Ajjul =

- Municipality type D (Village council)

Arabic transcription(s)
  - Arabic: عجّول
  - Latin: 'Ajjul (official); Ajoul (unofficial)
- Location of Ajjul within Palestine
- Coordinates: 32°01′22″N 35°10′49″E
- Palestine grid: 167/159
- State: State of Palestine
- Governorate: Ramallah and al-Bireh

Government
  - Type: Village council
  - Head of Municipality: Moussa Moussa

Area
  - Total: 6.6 km^{2} (2.5 sq mi)

Population (2017)
  - Total: 1,402
  - Density: 210/km^{2} (550/sq mi)
- Name meaning: "Calves"

Ajjul (Arabic: عجّول) is a Palestinian village in the Ramallah and al-Bireh Governorate in the northern West Bank, located north of Ramallah. There are two archaeological sites or khirbets to the east of the village. One of the khirbets is dedicated to a former resident of Ajjul, Sheikh Abdul. Ajjul is governed by a village council of three members.

== Location ==
Ajjul is located 13.4 kilometers (8.3 mi) (horizontally) north of Ramallah. It is bordered by Atara to the south and east, Abwein to the east, Bani Zeid ash Sharqiya to the north, and Deir as-Sudan and Umm Safa to the west. Ajjul lies at an altitude of 484 meters above sea level.

== History ==
Ajjul is a village on an ancient site. Potsherds from the Iron Age, Persian, Hellenistic, Roman/Byzantine, Crusader/Ayyubid, Mamluk and early Ottoman period have also been found. Rock-cut tombs have been found, and ancient architectural fragments have been reused in a mosque.

=== Crusader/Ayyubid period ===
In the 12th and 13th centuries, during the Crusader period, Ajjul was inhabited by Muslims, according to the Muslim scholar Diya al-Din (d. 1245). A mosque in the village has an inscription in the south wall, dating it to 1196. The inscription is in Ayyubid naskhi script.

Röhricht (1842–1905 suggested that Ajjul was the Crusader place called Gul; however, Conder (1848–1910) disagreed.

=== Ottoman period ===
The village was incorporated into the Ottoman Empire in 1517 with all of Palestine, and in 1596 it appeared in the tax registers as being in the Nahiya of Quds of the Liwa of Quds. It had a population of 79 households, all Muslim. They paid a fixed tax rate of 33,3% on agricultural products, which included wheat, barley, summer crops, vineyards and fruit trees, olives, goats and/or beehives; a total of 8,745 akçe. Half of the revenue went to a Waqf.

In the 17th century, the village received an influx of refugees from Beit Qufa near Lydda, who had to abandon their home due to unsettled conditions.

In 1838 Ajjul was noted as a Muslim village in the Beni Zeid administrative region. In 1870 Victor Guérin passed by the village, which he called A'djoul, and estimated it to have about 300 inhabitants. Around Ajjul he found large fig and carob-trees, besides pomegranate, mulberry and apricot trees. An official Ottoman village list from about the same year showed that Ajjul had 79 houses and a population of 250, though the population count included men, only.

In 1882, the PEF's Survey of Western Palestine described Ajjul as a "village of moderate size, with a well. It is on high ground, with olives round it, and ancient tombs. An ancient road leads towards it on the south." In 1896 the population of Ajjul was estimated to be about 468 persons.

=== British Mandate ===
In the 1922 census of Palestine conducted by the British Mandate authorities, Ajjul had a population of 202, all Muslim. By the time of the 1931 census, Ajjul had 79 occupied houses and a population of 292, still all Muslim.

In the 1945 statistics, the population was 350 Muslims, and the total land area was 6,639 dunams, according to an official land and population survey. Of this, 3,507 were allocated for plantations and irrigable land, 863 for cereals, while 14 dunams were classified as built-up areas.

=== Jordanian period ===
In the wake of the 1948 Arab–Israeli War, and after the 1949 Armistice Agreements, Ajjul came under Jordanian rule.

The Jordanian census of 1961 found 600 inhabitants here.

=== Post 1967 ===
Since the Six-Day War in 1967, Ajjul has been under Israeli occupation.

After the 1995 accords, 48.3% of Ajjul land is defined as Area A land, 27.2% is Area B, while the remaining 24.5% is defined as Area C. Israel has confiscated 363 dunams of village land in order to construct the Israeli settlement of Ateret.

== Demographics ==
According to the Palestinian Central Bureau of Statistics (PCBS), Ajjul had a population of 1,402 inhabitants in 2017. In a 1997 PCBS census, 4.2% of Ajjul's population — which was 1,026 — were Palestinian refugees. The largest age group in the village were infants to 14-year-olds, making up 44.2% of the population. About 25.3% of the population is between the ages of 15 and 29, 24.2% between 30 and 64 and residents 65 or older represent 6.3% of the population. There were slightly more males (51.7%) than females (49.3%) in Ajjul's gender make-up. In the 2007 PCBS census, the figures of Ajjul's population showed a smaller population of 1,237 people, of which 601 were males and 636 were females.

== Infrastructure ==
Ajjul contains a clinic that is primarily involved in blood testing. Most of the residents receive medical help from the Palestinian Red Crescent stationed in nearby Sinjil. The nearest hospital is in Ramallah.

Two mosques are located in Ajjul: a modern one and an older renovated one.

There is a mixed-gender secondary school in the village, in which 400 students are enrolled. Students attend science and literature classes at the Prince Hassan School in Bir Zeit. Ajjul has about 50 college and university students. There is no postal service in the village.

== Bibliography ==
- Barron, J.B., ed. (1923). Palestine: Report and General Abstracts of the Census of 1922. Government of Palestine.
- Conder, C.R.; Kitchener, H.H. (1882). The Survey of Western Palestine: Memoirs of the Topography, Orography, Hydrography, and Archaeology. Vol. 2. London: Committee of the Palestine Exploration Fund.
- Conder, C.R. (1890). "Norman Palestine". Quarterly Statement - Palestine Exploration Fund. 22: 29–37. doi:10.1179/peq.1890.22.1.29.
- Dauphin, C. (1998). La Palestine byzantine, Peuplement et Populations. BAR International Series 726 (in French). Vol. III : Catalogue. Oxford: Archeopress. ISBN 0-86054-905-4.
- Ellenblum, R. (2003). Frankish Rural Settlement in the Latin Kingdom of Jerusalem. Cambridge University Press. ISBN 978-0-521-52187-1.
- Finkelstein, I.; Lederman, Zvi, eds. (1997). Highlands of many cultures. Tel Aviv: Institute of Archaeology of Tel Aviv University Publications Section. ISBN 965-440-007-3.
- Government of Jordan, Department of Statistics (1964). First Census of Population and Housing. Volume I: Final Tables; General Characteristics of the Population (PDF).
- Government of Palestine, Department of Statistics (1945). Village Statistics, April, 1945.
- Guérin, V. (1875). Description Géographique Historique et Archéologique de la Palestine (in French). Vol. 2: Samarie, pt. 2. Paris: L'Imprimerie Nationale.
- Hadawi, S. (1970). Village Statistics of 1945: A Classification of Land and Area ownership in Palestine. Palestine Liberation Organization Research Centre. Archived from the original on 2018-12-08.
- Hartmann, M. (1883). "Die Ortschaftenliste des Liwa Jerusalem in dem türkischen Staatskalender für Syrien auf das Jahr 1288 der Flucht (1871)". Zeitschrift des Deutschen Palästina-Vereins. 6: 102–149.
- Hütteroth, W.-D.; Abdulfattah, K. (1977). Historical Geography of Palestine, Transjordan and Southern Syria in the Late 16th Century. Erlanger Geographische Arbeiten, Sonderband 5. Erlangen, Germany: Vorstand der Fränkischen Geographischen Gesellschaft. ISBN 3-920405-41-2.
- Mills, E., ed. (1932). Census of Palestine 1931. Population of Villages, Towns and Administrative Areas. Jerusalem: Government of Palestine.
- Palmer, E.H. (1881). The Survey of Western Palestine: Arabic and English Name Lists Collected During the Survey by Lieutenants Conder and Kitchener, R. E. Transliterated and Explained by E.H. Palmer. Committee of the Palestine Exploration Fund.
- Robinson, E.; Smith, E. (1841). Biblical Researches in Palestine, Mount Sinai and Arabia Petraea: A Journal of Travels in the year 1838. Vol. 3. Boston: Crocker & Brewster.
- Röhricht, R. (1887). "Studien zur mittelalterlichen Geographie und Topographie Syriens". Zeitschrift des Deutschen Palästina-Vereins. 10: 195–344.
- Schick, C. (1896). "Zur Einwohnerzahl des Bezirks Jerusalem". Zeitschrift des Deutschen Palästina-Vereins. 19: 120–127.
- Sharon, M. (1997). Corpus Inscriptionum Arabicarum Palaestinae, A. Vol. 1. BRILL. ISBN 90-04-10833-5.
- Socin, A. (1879). "Alphabetisches Verzeichniss von Ortschaften des Paschalik Jerusalem". Zeitschrift des Deutschen Palästina-Vereins. 2: 135–163.
