= 'Atara =

- Municipality type D (Village council)

Arabic transcription(s)
  - Arabic: عطارة
  - Latin: Attara (official); Ataroth (unofficial)
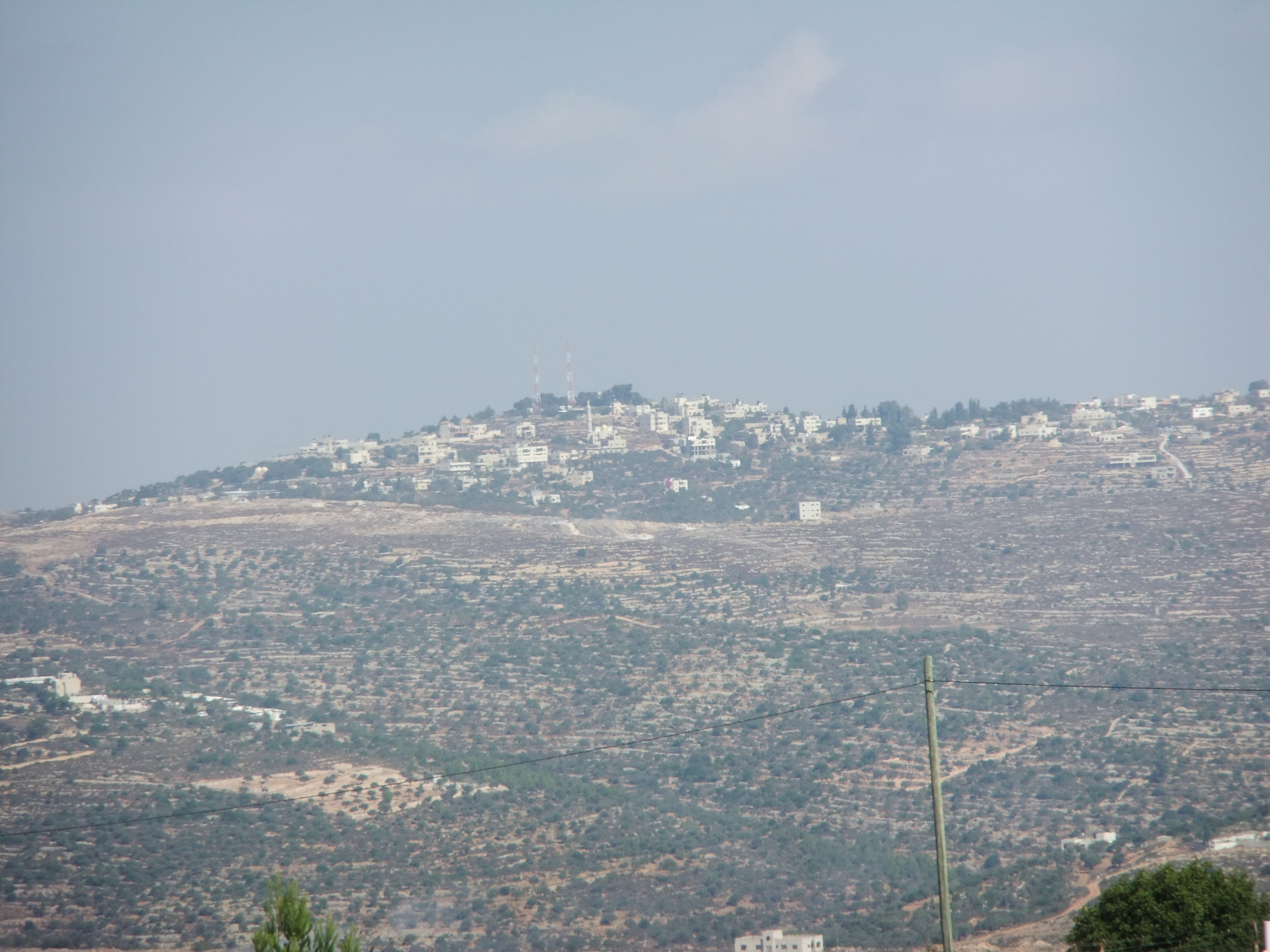
- View of 'Atara

- Location of 'Atara within Palestine
- Coordinates: 32°00′09″N 35°12′23″E
- Palestine grid: 169/156
- State: State of Palestine
- Governorate: Ramallah and al-Bireh

Government
  - Type: Village council
  - Control: Israel

Area
  - Total: 9.5 km^{2} (3.7 sq mi)

Population (2017)
  - Total: 2,492
  - Density: 260/km^{2} (680/sq mi)
- Name meaning: Attara, Ataroth

'Atara (Arabic: عطارة 'Atâra) is a Palestinian village in the Ramallah and al-Bireh Governorate, located 15 kilometers north of Ramallah in the central West Bank. It is situated along a mountain ridge line with four peaks and is built upon the second highest point in the West Bank at 810 meters above sea level. 'Atara's total land area consists of 9,545 dunams, most of which is cultivable.

== Location ==
'Atara is located 10.7 kilometers (6.6 mi) (horizontally) north of Ramallah. It is bordered by Silwad to the east, 'Abwein to the north, Burham, 'Ajjul and Umm Safa to the west, and Bir Zeit to the south.

== History ==
Sherds from the Iron Age I, Iron Age II, Persian, Hellenistic, Roman, Byzantine and Mamluk eras have been found. Edward Robinson identified 'Atara with the Biblical Ataroth mentioned in the Book of Joshua 16:2. However, some modern authorities prefer to place Ataroth elsewhere.

=== Ottoman era ===
In 1517, the village was incorporated into the Ottoman Empire with the rest of Palestine. In 1596 it appeared in the tax registers as being in the Nahiya of Quds of the Liwa of Quds. It had a population of 55 Muslim households who paid a fixed tax rate of 33.3% on various agricultural products, including wheat, barley, olives, vineyards or fruit trees, and goats or beehives; a total of 4,300 Akçe.

In the 17th-19th centuries, 'Atara was located in the nahiya of Bani Zeid. Adult males were required to pay 58-60 akçe to the Ottoman government in Jerusalem. It was also noted as a Muslim village.

The French explorer Victor Guérin passed by the village in 1870, and estimated it to have about 300 inhabitants. An official Ottoman village list from about the same time (1870) showed that 'Atara had a total of 80 houses and a population of 225, though the population count included men only. In 1882, the PEF's Survey of Western Palestine described Attara as a large village, seemingly ancient, in a conspicuous position on a hill, with olives round it.

In 1896 the population of Atara was estimated to be about 480 persons.

=== British Mandate of Palestine ===
At the time of the 1922 census of Palestine, Atara had a population of 407 Muslims, increasing in the 1931 census to 559 Muslims in 133 houses. In 1922, the Jewish National Fund established a moshav on 500 dunams of land. Known as Ataroth, it was one of the first Zionist hill settlements.

In the 1945 statistics the population of 'Atara was 690 Muslims, while the total land area was 9,545 dunams, according to an official land and population survey. Of this, 3,524 were allocated for plantations and irrigable land, 3,550 for cereals, while 45 dunams were classified as built-up areas.

=== Jordanian era ===
In the wake of the 1948 Arab–Israeli War, and after the 1949 Armistice Agreements, 'Atara came under Jordanian rule.

The Jordanian census of 1961 found 1,110 inhabitants.

=== Post-1967 ===
Since the Six-Day War in 1967, 'Atara has been under Israeli occupation. The population in the 1967 census conducted by the Israeli authorities was 903, of whom 61 originated from the Israeli territory.

After the 1995 accords, 40.8% of village land has been defined as Area A land, 43.8% as Area B, while the remaining 15.4% is Area C. Israel has confiscated a total of 163 dunams of land from the village in order to construct the Israeli settlement of Ateret.

In 2002, 95-year-old Atara resident Fatima Hassan became the oldest Palestinian fatality in the Second Intifada when the taxi she was in was shot at by Israeli soldiers. Witnesses said the car was waiting in a long line of cars and soldiers smashed the windows before firing. An Israeli military source said soldiers fired at the taxi after it ignored orders to halt on a prohibited road.

Following the establishment of an Israeli outpost near the village in August 2025, a series of coordinated attacks, including incursions and harassment, grazed livestock between shelters, damaged fodder, obstructed access to grazing land, and threats of violence. Consequently, in January 2026 herders were displaced from their homes in area B on the outskirts of the village to a more populated area with limited access to grazing

== Sanctuaries ==
'Atara contains two sanctuaries for saintly figures. The village's old mosque encases the Sanctuary of I'mar. There used to stand a Byzantine church.

=== Shrine of Sheikh al-Qatrawani ===
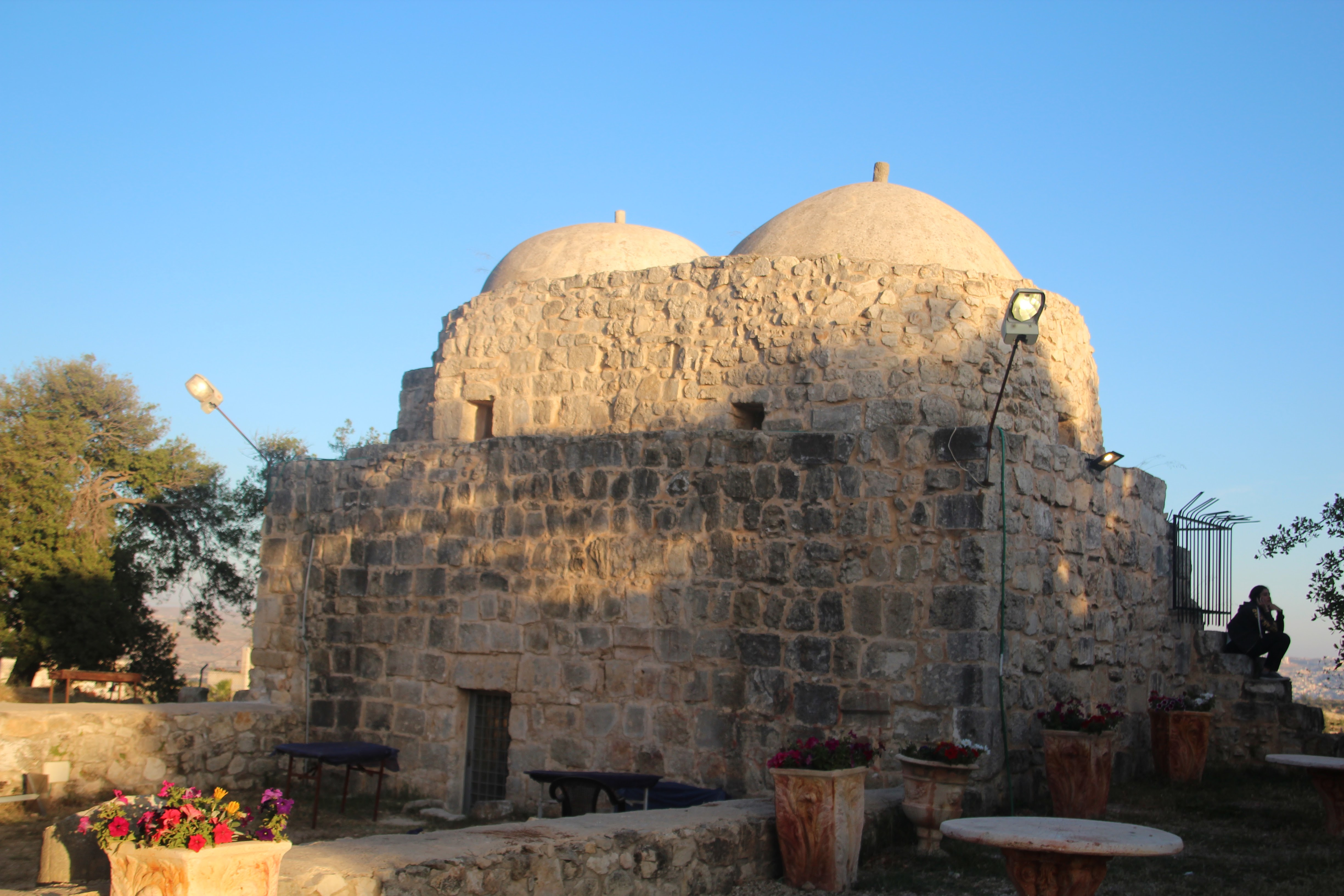
The Mamluk period Maqam Sheikh al-Qatrawani shrine in 2017.

The historic maqam of Sheikh al-Qatrawani is located on the Dahrat Hamoud hill about 1.5 km south-west of Atara. The shrine is named after a local holy man, Sheikh Ahmad al-Qatrawani, who is believed to have died here with miraculous happenings. It is built during the Mamluk period in the 16th century, as part of a series of watchtowers looking over the nearby coast.

== Demographics ==
Emigration surged between 1952 and 1955 to the Gulf Arab states, due to poor economic conditions in the West Bank. Several others moved to Ramallah and Jerusalem for work. By 1961, the population was 1,110, however, it decreased tremendously after the 1967 Six-Day War, in which Israel captured and occupied the West Bank from Jordan. The village population slowly grew to 903 in 1982, then 976 in 1987.

In the first census taken by the Palestinian Central Bureau of Statistics (PCBS) in 1997, 'Atara's population reached 1,661, of which 92 were Palestinian refugees (5.6%). The gender make-up was 50.2% male and 49.8% female. According to a PCBS estimate, 'Atara had a population of approximately 2,400 inhabitants in mid-year 2006. In the PCBS census in 2007, 'Atara had a population of 2,270, of which 1,139 were males and 1,131 females. There 495 housing units and the average household size consisted of 5.5 family members. By 2017, the village had a population of 2,492.

== Economy ==
Until the early 1950s, 'Atara's inhabitants were dependent on agriculture as a main source of income. After 1967, many inhabitants began to work in Israel. As a result, agricultural production has been further reduced and a substantial portion of 'Atara's economy became dependent residents working abroad. Transportation is an issue in the village, with only one road being able to access through Bir Zeit.

Eggs are a primary agricultural product and there are eleven egg farms in the village. Olives are also widely produced and are delivered to an oil pressing factory in the town of 'Arura, where olive oil is produced. Israeli checkpoints around 'Atara, as well as the harvest of 'Atara's olive crop by Israeli settlers from Ateret has effectively strained the village's economy.

40.8% of village land is defined as Area A land, 43.8% as Area B, while the remaining 15.4% is defined as Area C. Israel has confiscated 163 dunums of the village land in order to construct the Israeli settlement of Ateret.

== Bibliography ==
- Barron, J.B., ed. (1923). Palestine: Report and General Abstracts of the Census of 1922. Government of Palestine.
- Canaan, T. (1927). Mohammedan Saints and Sanctuaries in Palestine. London: Luzac & Co. (p. 269)
- Conder, C.R.; Kitchener, H.H. (1882). The Survey of Western Palestine: Memoirs of the Topography, Orography, Hydrography, and Archaeology. Vol. 2. London: Committee of the Palestine Exploration Fund.
- Dauphin, C. (1998). La Palestine byzantine, Peuplement et Populations. BAR International Series 726 (in French). Vol. III : Catalogue. Oxford: Archeopress. ISBN 0-860549-05-4.
- Finkelstein, I.; Lederman, Zvi, eds. (1997). Highlands of many cultures. Tel Aviv: Institute of Archaeology of Tel Aviv University Publications Section. ISBN 965-440-007-3.
- Government of Jordan, Department of Statistics (1964). First Census of Population and Housing. Volume I: Final Tables; General Characteristics of the Population (PDF).
- Government of Palestine, Department of Statistics (1945). Village Statistics, April, 1945.
- Guérin, V. (1875). Description Géographique Historique et Archéologique de la Palestine (in French). Vol. 2: Samarie, pt. 2. Paris: L'Imprimerie Nationale.
- Hadawi, S. (1970). Village Statistics of 1945: A Classification of Land and Area ownership in Palestine. Palestine Liberation Organization Research Centre.
- Hartmann, M. (1883). "Die Ortschaftenliste des Liwa Jerusalem in dem türkischen Staatskalender für Syrien auf das Jahr 1288 der Flucht (1871)". Zeitschrift des Deutschen Palästina-Vereins. 6: 102–149.
- Hütteroth, W.-D.; Abdulfattah, K. (1977). Historical Geography of Palestine, Transjordan and Southern Syria in the Late 16th Century. Erlanger Geographische Arbeiten, Sonderband 5. Erlangen, Germany: Vorstand der Fränkischen Geographischen Gesellschaft. ISBN 3-920405-41-2.
- Kahle, P.E. (1918). Volkserzählungen aus Palästina. Vandenhoeck und Ruprecht. (Cited in Hamdan Taha)
- Mills, E., ed. (1932). Census of Palestine 1931. Population of Villages, Towns and Administrative Areas. Jerusalem: Government of Palestine.
- Palmer, E.H. (1881). The Survey of Western Palestine: Arabic and English Name Lists Collected During the Survey by Lieutenants Conder and Kitchener, R. E. Transliterated and Explained by E.H. Palmer. Committee of the Palestine Exploration Fund.
- Robinson, E.; Smith, E. (1841). Biblical Researches in Palestine, Mount Sinai and Arabia Petraea: A Journal of Travels in the year 1838. Vol. 2. Boston: Crocker & Brewster.
- Robinson, E.; Smith, E. (1841). Biblical Researches in Palestine, Mount Sinai and Arabia Petraea: A Journal of Travels in the year 1838. Vol. 3. Boston: Crocker & Brewster.
- Schick, C. (1896). "Zur Einwohnerzahl des Bezirks Jerusalem". Zeitschrift des Deutschen Palästina-Vereins. 19: 120–127.
- Singer, A. (1994). Palestinian peasants and Ottoman officials: rural administration around sixteenth-century Jerusalem (3rd, illustrated ed.). Cambridge University Press. ISBN 0-521-47679-8.
- Socin, A. (1879). "Alphabetisches Verzeichniss von Ortschaften des Paschalik Jerusalem". Zeitschrift des Deutschen Palästina-Vereins. 2: 135–163.
- Tsafrir, Y.; Leah Di Segni; Judith Green (1994). (TIR): Tabula Imperii Romani: Judaea, Palaestina. Jerusalem: Israel Academy of Sciences and Humanities. ISBN 965-208-107-8.
