= Umm Safa =

Village in the Ramallah and al-Bireh Governorate, West Bank

- Municipality type D (Village council)

Arabic transcription(s)
  - Arabic: أم صفا
  - Latin: Kafr Ishwa (unofficial)
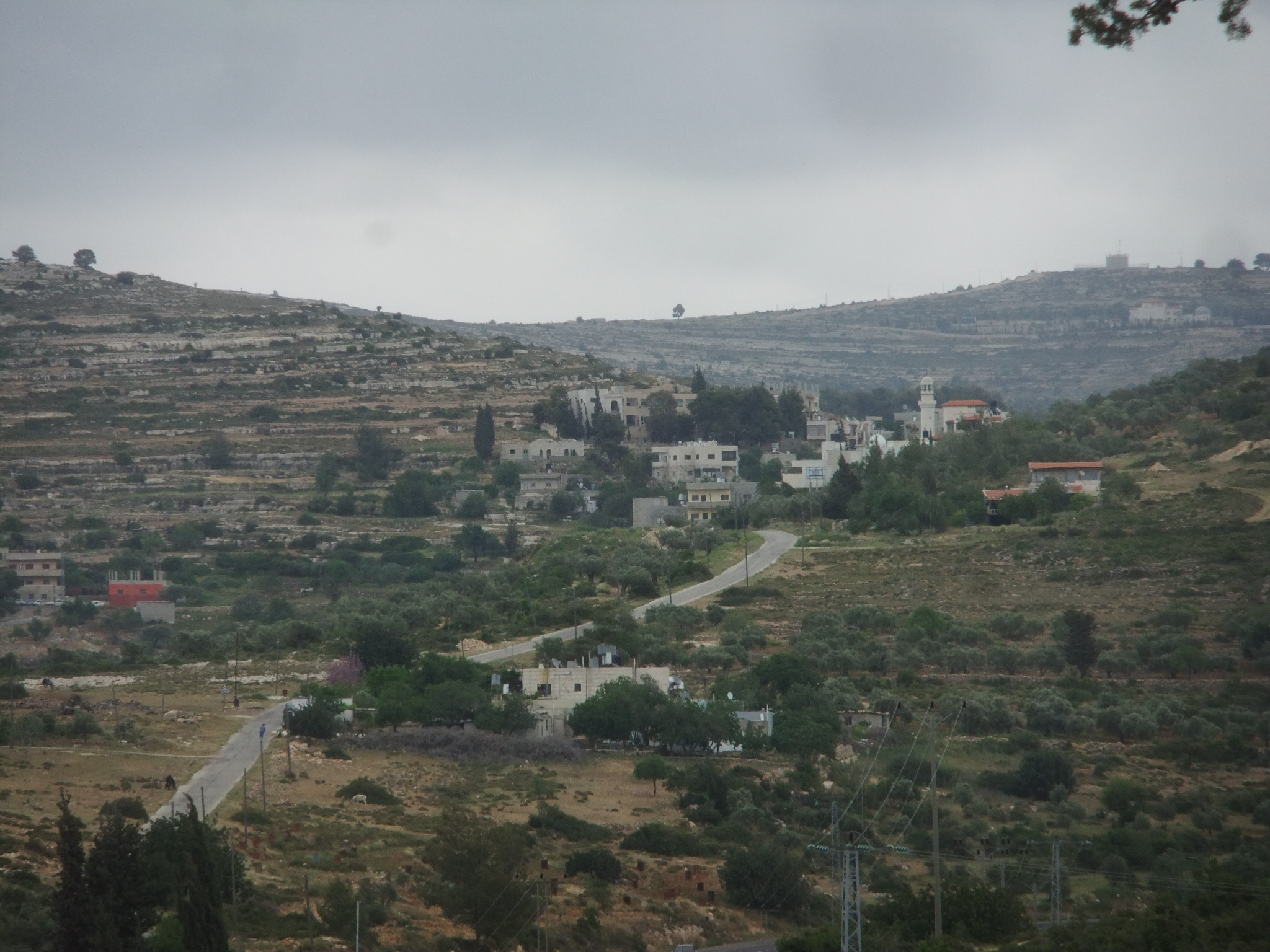
- Umm Safa from the west

- Location of Umm Safa within Palestine
- Coordinates: 32°00′30″N 35°09′50″E
- Palestine grid: 165/157
- State: State of Palestine
- Governorate: Ramallah and al-Bireh

Government
  - Type: Village council
- Elevation: 647 m (2,123 ft)

Population (2017)
  - Total: 681
- Name meaning: "the mother of flat ground"

Umm Safa/Kafr Ishwa (Arabic: أم صفا) or Um Al-Safa is a Palestinian village in the Ramallah and al-Bireh Governorate.

== Location ==
Umm Safa is located 12.1 kilometers (7.5 mi) north of Ramallah. It is bordered by 'Ajjul and 'Atara to the east, Deir as Sudan and Ajjul to the north, Nabi Salih and Deir Nidham to the west, and Jibiya, Burham and Kobar to the south.

=== Important Bird Area ===
A largely forested 3,500 ha site in the vicinity of the villages of Umm Safa and Nabi Salih has been recognised as an Important Bird Area (IBA) by BirdLife International because it supports a population of lesser spotted eagles.

== History ==
It has been suggested that the village was "apparently connected with an ancient Mizpeh," although this has not been borne out by modern archaeology.

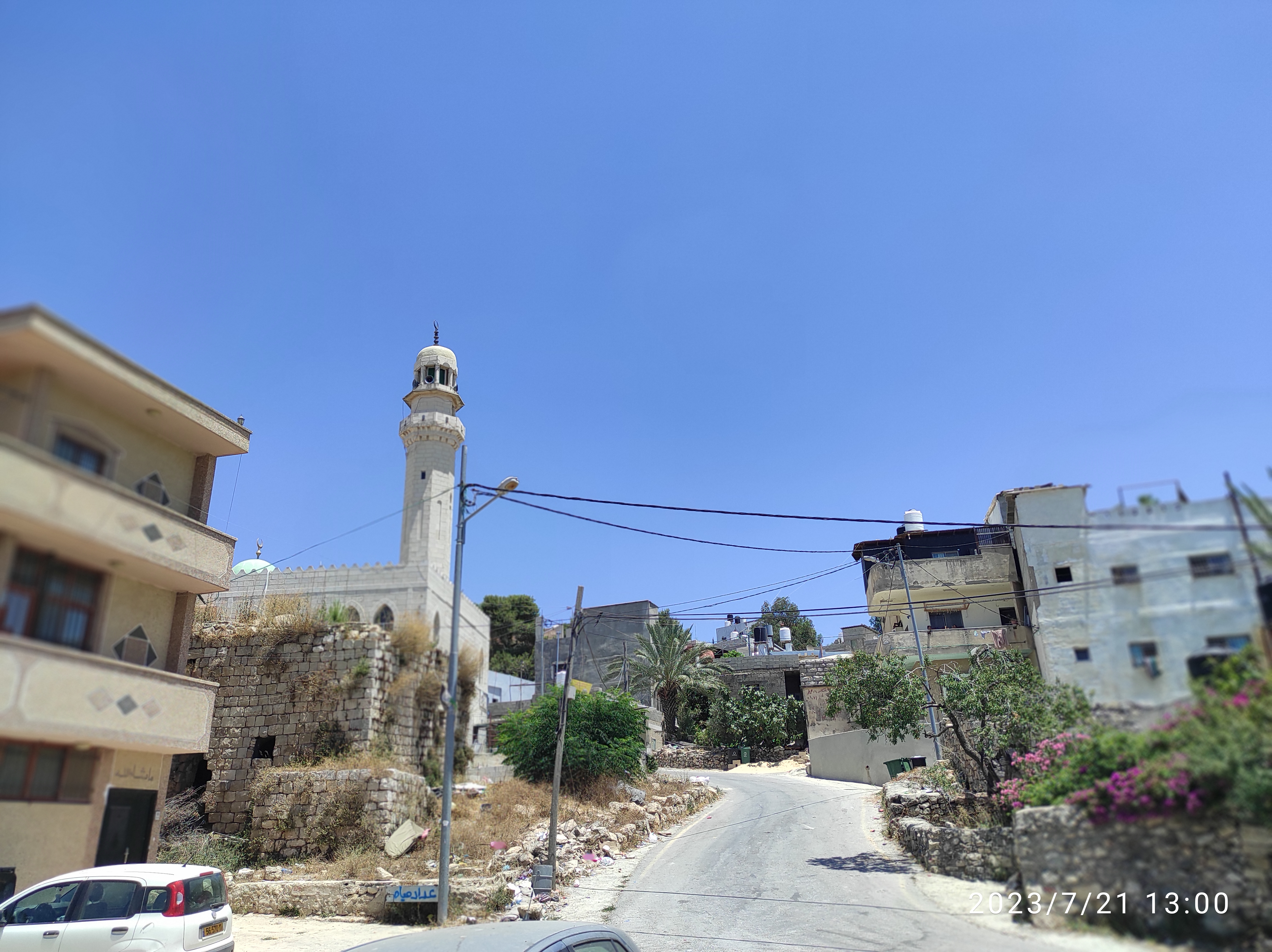
Mosque in Umm Safa

Ceramic remains from the Byzantine era have been found here, as have sherds from the Crusader/Ayyubid and Mamluk eras.

=== Ottoman era ===
Pottery sherds from the early Ottoman era have been found here, and a village by the name of "Kfar Shu" appears in 17th century tax records.

In 1838 Um Safah was noted as a Muslim village in the Beni Zaid district.

In 1870, Victor Guérin climbed up on the hilltop which Umm Safa occupied, and found that the village had about 300 inhabitants. He further noted that: "It must go back to an ancient site as is shown by the materials used in the building of some houses and several columnar sections scattered about the ground. A copious spring, called Ain Umm Safa, provides the villagers with water. They venerate, under a koubbeh, the remains of Nabi Hanan." An official Ottoman village list from about the same year, 1870, listed Kefr Eschwa as having 24 houses and a population of 120, though the population count included men, only. It was noted as being located north of Dschibija.

In 1882 the PEF's Survey of Western Palestine (SWP) described Umm Suffah (also called Kefr Ishwah) as "a village on high ground on the Roman road to Antipatris. It contains a small mosque or Moslem chapel, and has a well to the north."

==== Tomb of Nabi Hanun ====
Located within the village is the mosque of a-Nabi Hanun, which includes an unmarked grave said to belong to a local Muslim saint of the same name. The mosque was built in 1986 following the destruction of the previous tomb housing the remains. Local tradition says that Nabi Hanun and Nabi Sair, whose grave was in the western part of the village, were both sons of Yaqub (Jacob).

=== British Mandate era ===
In the 1922 census of Palestine, conducted by the British Mandate authorities, Umm Sufa had a population of 80 Muslims, increasing in the 1931 census to 89 Muslims, in 27 houses in Umm Safah (or Kafr Ishwa).

In the 1945 statistics, the population of Umm Safa (Kafr Ishwa) was 110 Muslims, while the total land area was 4,083 dunams, according to an official land and population survey. Of this, 1,364 dunums were used for plantations and irrigable land, 821 for cereals, while 17 dunams were classified as built-up areas.

=== Jordanian era ===
In the wake of the 1948 Arab–Israeli War, and after the 1949 Armistice Agreements, Umm Safa came under Jordanian rule.

The Jordanian census of 1961 found 252 inhabitants in Umm Safa.

=== 1967-present ===
Since the Six-Day War in 1967, Umm Safa has been under Israeli occupation.

After the 1995 accords, 16% of village land has been defined as Area B land, while the remaining 84% is Area C. Israel has confiscated a total of 227 dunams of land from the village in order to construct two Israeli settlements: Ateret and Hallamish.

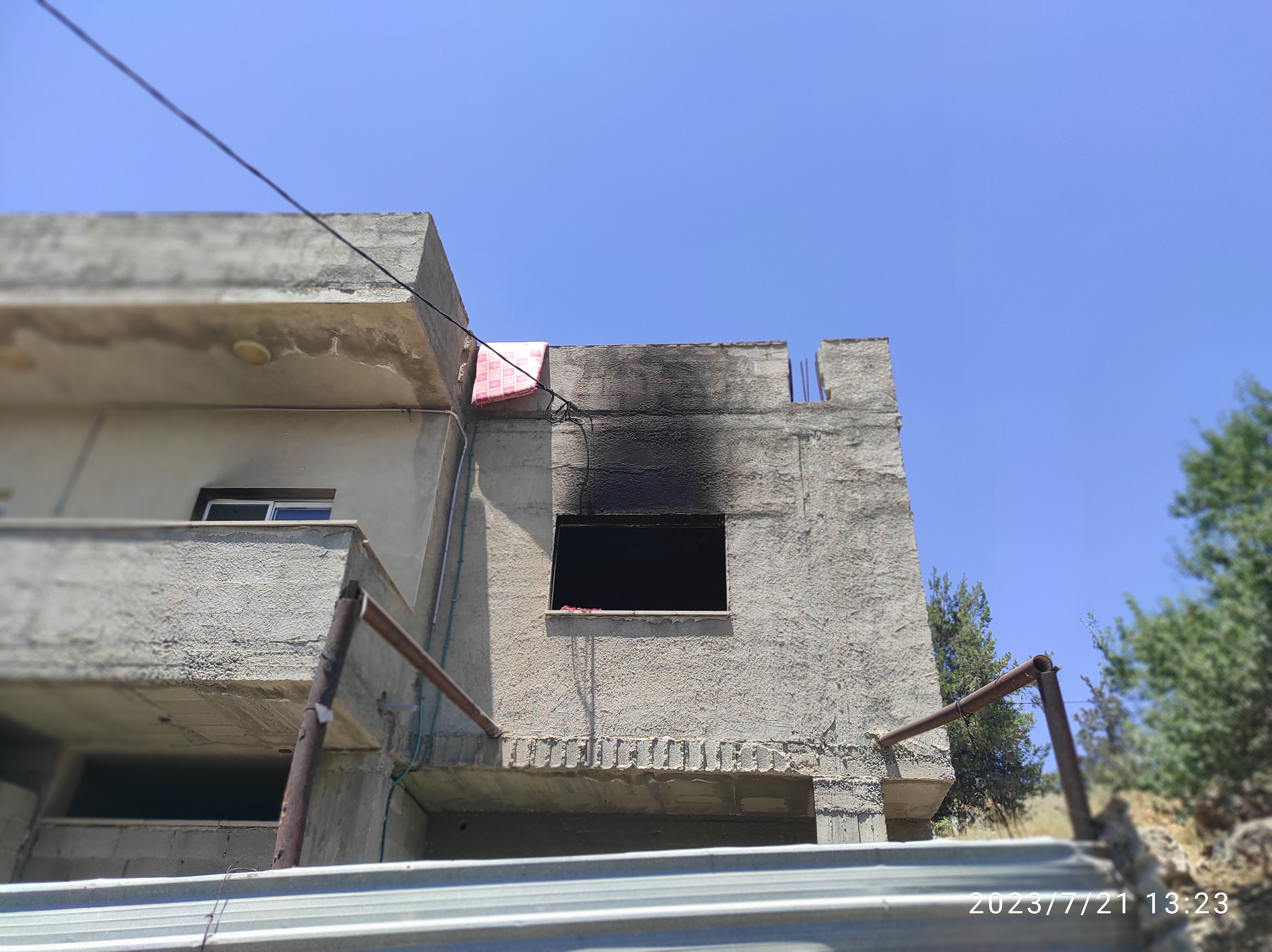
A house burned by Israeli settlers in Umm Safa June 2023

In June 2023, the village was attacked by dozens of settlers who burned houses and vehicles

The village has two tombs within it.

== Bibliography ==
- Barron, J.B., ed. (1923). Palestine: Report and General Abstracts of the Census of 1922. Government of Palestine.
- Dauphin, C. (1998). La Palestine byzantine, Peuplement et Populations. BAR International Series 726 (in French). Vol. III : Catalogue. Oxford: Archeopress. ISBN 0-860549-05-4.
- Conder, C.R.; Kitchener, H.H. (1882). The Survey of Western Palestine: Memoirs of the Topography, Orography, Hydrography, and Archaeology. Vol. 2. London: Committee of the Palestine Exploration Fund.
- Finkelstein, I.; Lederman, Zvi, eds. (1997). Highlands of many cultures. Tel Aviv: Institute of Archaeology of Tel Aviv University Publications Section. ISBN 965-440-007-3.
- Frantzman, Seth J. and Doron Bar (2013). "Mapping Muslim Sacred Tombs in Palestine During the Mandate Period". Levant. 45 (1): 96–111. doi:10.1179/0075891412Z.00000000011. S2CID 162185684. "Zibda, Umm Safa and Sinjil in the northern central highlands had two [tombs] each"
- Government of Jordan, Department of Statistics (1964). First Census of Population and Housing. Volume I: Final Tables; General Characteristics of the Population (PDF).
- Government of Palestine, Department of Statistics (1945). Village Statistics, April, 1945.
- Guérin, V. (1869). Description Géographique Historique et Archéologique de la Palestine (in French). Vol. 1: Judee, pt. 3. Paris: L'Imprimerie Nationale. (Kefr Achoua (p. 39) ..mentioned in Socin)
- Guérin, V. (1875). Description Géographique Historique et Archéologique de la Palestine (in French). Vol. 2: Samarie, pt. 2. Paris: L'Imprimerie Nationale.
- Hartmann, M. (1883). "Die Ortschaftenliste des Liwa Jerusalem in dem türkischen Staatskalender für Syrien auf das Jahr 1288 der Flucht (1871)". Zeitschrift des Deutschen Palästina-Vereins. 6: 102–149.
- Hadawi, S. (1970). Village Statistics of 1945: A Classification of Land and Area ownership in Palestine. Palestine Liberation Organization Research Center.
- Mills, E., ed. (1932). Census of Palestine 1931. Population of Villages, Towns and Administrative Areas. Jerusalem: Government of Palestine.
- Palmer, E.H. (1881). The Survey of Western Palestine: Arabic and English Name Lists Collected During the Survey by Lieutenants Conder and Kitchener, R. E. Transliterated and Explained by E.H. Palmer. Committee of the Palestine Exploration Fund.
- Robinson, E.; Smith, E. (1841). Biblical Researches in Palestine, Mount Sinai and Arabia Petraea: A Journal of Travels in the year 1838. Vol. 3. Boston: Crocker & Brewster.
- Socin, A. (1879). "Alphabetisches Verzeichniss von Ortschaften des Paschalik Jerusalem". Zeitschrift des Deutschen Palästina-Vereins. 2: 135–163.
- Toledano, E. (1984). "The Sanjaq of Jerusalem in the Sixteenth Century: Aspects of Topography and Population". Archivum Ottomanicum. 9: 279–319. Archived from the original on 2016-03-05.
