= Kafr Ein =

- Municipality type D (Village council)

Arabic transcription(s)
  - Arabic: كفر عين
  - Latin: Kafr 'Ayn (official); Kufur Ain (unofficial)
- Location of Kafr Ein within Palestine
- Coordinates: 32°02′54″N 35°07′12″E
- Palestine grid: 161/161
- State: State of Palestine
- Governorate: Ramallah and al-Bireh

Government
  - Type: Village council
  - Head of Municipality: Mohammed Rifa'

Area
  - Total: 25,000 dunams (25 km^{2}; 9.7 sq mi)

Population (2017)
  - Total: 1,958
  - Density: 78/km^{2} (200/sq mi)
- Name meaning: "The Village of the Spring"

Kafr Ein (Arabic: كفر عين) is a Palestinian village in the Ramallah and al-Bireh Governorate, located northwest of Ramallah in the central West Bank. According to the Palestinian Central Bureau of Statistics (PCBS), Kafr Ein had a population of 1,958 inhabitants in 2017. Most of the village's population comes from the Barghouti, Rifa' and Rafati clans.

== Location ==
Kafr 'Ein is located 17.7 km northwest of Ramallah. It is bordered by Qarawat Bani Zeid, Bani Zeid ash Sharqiya and Deir as Sudan to the east, Bruqin to the north, Bani Zeid to the west, and An Nabi Salih to the south.

== History ==
Kafr Ein is transliterated as "spring village". The village contains ten springs and ten reservoirs, one of which was recently damaged.

It is believed that there is an ancient site at the top of a local mountain known as Haraek, which contains a church and a mosque. According to local legend, the site was destroyed during the Crusades and the single villager who survived its destruction came down to found Kafr Ein.

=== Ottoman era ===
Potsherds from the early Ottoman era have been found. It is noted in the Ottoman tax records of the 16th century as being located in the Sanjak of Al-Quds.

Kafr Ein was ruled by the Barghouti family throughout the later half of the Ottoman rule of Palestine, located within the sheikhdom of Bani Zeid. It produced 52 qintars of olive oil annually, exporting it to Jerusalem or Nablus mainly for traditional soap-making.

In 1838, it was noted under the name of Kefr Iyan as a Muslim village in the District of Beni Zaid, north of Jerusalem.

The French explorer Victor Guérin passed by the village in 1870, and noted that it "did not seem very considerable," while an Ottoman village list of about the same year showed a population of 260, in 69 houses, though the population count only included men.

In 1882, the PEF's Survey of Western Palestine described "Kefr Ain" as a "small hamlet on a hill-slope, supplied by the Ain Mathrun."

In 1896 the population of Kefr ‘ain was estimated to be about 516 persons.

=== British Mandate era ===
In the 1922 census of Palestine conducted by the British Mandate authorities, the village, called Kufr 'Ain, had a population of 376, all Muslims, increasing in the 1931 census where In Kafr had a population of 494, still all Muslims, in a total of 133 houses.

In the 1945 statistics, the population was 550 Muslims, while the total land area was 7,145 dunams, according to an official land and population survey. Of this, 4,928 were allocated for plantations and irrigable land, 724 for cereals, while 19 dunams were classified as built-up areas.

=== Jordanian era ===
In the wake of the 1948 Arab–Israeli War, and after the 1949 Armistice Agreements, Kafr Ein came under Jordanian rule.

The Jordanian census of 1961 found 1,095 inhabitants in Kafr 'Ain.

=== 1967-present ===
Since the Six-Day War in 1967, Kafr Ein has been held under Israeli occupation.

After the 1995 accords, 97.4% of Kafr Ein land was classified as Area A land, 1.4% as Area B, while the remaining 1.2% is classified as Area C.

== Economy ==
Historically, like most Palestinian villages, Kafr Ein's inhabitants worked mostly as farmers and traders. Prior to the Second Intifada, around 10% of the village's residents worked in Israel. Kafr Ein's main cash crop is olives. However, lentils, grains and vegetables are also grown. There are an estimated 200 sheep and goats in the village.

In 1980, electricity was connected to Kafr Ein. There are ten shops and a school in the village, as well another shared with Qarawat Bani Zeid. Many residents receive aid from the Red Cross and the UNRWA.

== Government ==
Kafr Ein is governed by a village council. The council is made up of six residents who represent the four major families. The current mayor, Mohammed Rifa', was appointed by the Palestinian National Authority in 1998.

== Bibliography ==
- Barron, J.B., ed. (1923). Palestine: Report and General Abstracts of the Census of 1922. Government of Palestine.
- Conder, C.R.; Kitchener, H.H. (1882). The Survey of Western Palestine: Memoirs of the Topography, Orography, Hydrography, and Archaeology. Vol. 2. London: Committee of the Palestine Exploration Fund.
- Dauphin, C. (1998). La Palestine byzantine, Peuplement et Populations. BAR International Series 726 (in French). Vol. III : Catalogue. Oxford: Archeopress. ISBN 0-860549-05-4.
- Finkelstein, I.; Lederman, Zvi, eds. (1997). Highlands of many cultures. Tel Aviv: Institute of Archaeology of Tel Aviv University Publications Section. ISBN 965-440-007-3.
- Government of Jordan, Department of Statistics (1964). First Census of Population and Housing. Volume I: Final Tables; General Characteristics of the Population (PDF).
- Government of Palestine, Department of Statistics (1945). Village Statistics, April, 1945.
- Guérin, V. (1875). Description Géographique Historique et Archéologique de la Palestine (in French). Vol. 2: Samarie, pt. 2. Paris: L'Imprimerie Nationale.
- Hadawi, S. (1970). Village Statistics of 1945: A Classification of Land and Area ownership in Palestine. Palestine Liberation Organization Research Center.
- Hartmann, M. (1883). "Die Ortschaftenliste des Liwa Jerusalem in dem türkischen Staatskalender für Syrien auf das Jahr 1288 der Flucht (1871)". Zeitschrift des Deutschen Palästina-Vereins. 6: 102–149.
- Macalister, R.A.S.; Masterman, E.W.G. (1905). "Occasional Papers on the Modern inhabitants of Palestine, part I & part II". Quarterly Statement - Palestine Exploration Fund. 37: 343–356. doi:10.1179/peq.1905.37.4.343.
- Mills, E., ed. (1932). Census of Palestine 1931. Population of Villages, Towns and Administrative Areas. Jerusalem: Government of Palestine.
- Palmer, E.H. (1881). The Survey of Western Palestine: Arabic and English Name Lists Collected During the Survey by Lieutenants Conder and Kitchener, R. E. Transliterated and Explained by E.H. Palmer. Committee of the Palestine Exploration Fund.
- Robinson, E.; Smith, E. (1841). Biblical Researches in Palestine, Mount Sinai and Arabia Petraea: A Journal of Travels in the year 1838. Vol. 3. Boston: Crocker & Brewster.
- Schick, C. (1896). "Zur Einwohnerzahl des Bezirks Jerusalem". Zeitschrift des Deutschen Palästina-Vereins. 19: 120–127.
- Singer, A. (1994). Palestinian peasants and Ottoman officials: rural administration around sixteenth-century Jerusalem (3rd, Illustrated ed.). Cambridge University Press. ISBN 978-0-521-47679-9.
- Socin, A. (1879). "Alphabetisches Verzeichniss von Ortschaften des Paschalik Jerusalem". Zeitschrift des Deutschen Palästina-Vereins. 2: 135–163.
- Toledano, E. (1984). "The Sanjaq of Jerusalem in the Sixteenth Century: Aspects of Topography and Population". Archivum Ottomanicum. 9: 279–319. Archived from the original on 2016-03-05.
- Wilson, C.T. (1906). Peasant Life in the Holy Land. New York: E. P. Dutton.
