= Deir as-Sudan =

- Municipality type C

Arabic transcription(s)
  - Arabic: دير السودان
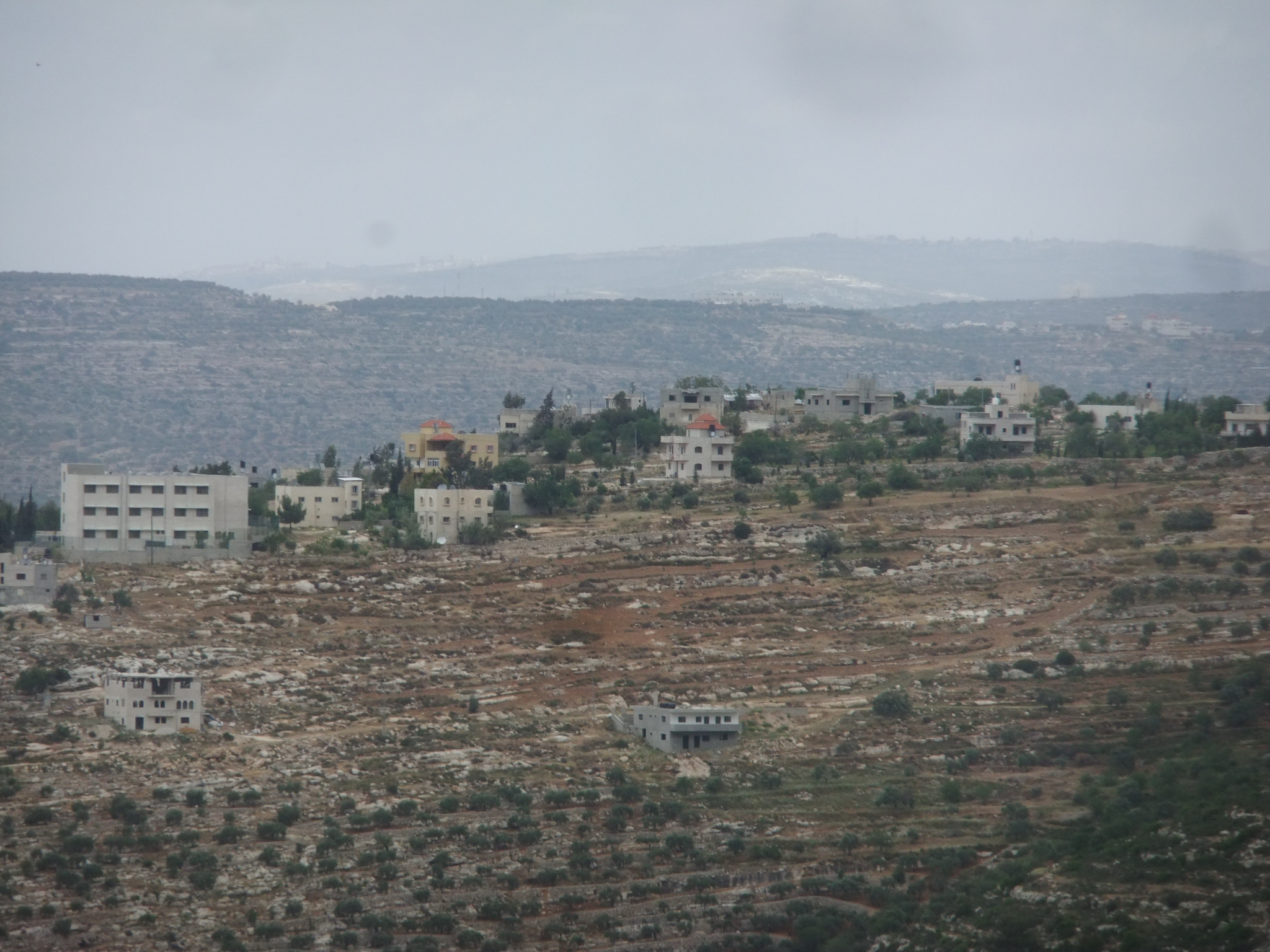
- Deir as-Sudan

- Location of Deir as-Sudan within Palestine
- Coordinates: 32°01′59″N 35°08′54″E
- Palestine grid: 164/160
- State: State of Palestine
- Governorate: Ramallah and al-Bireh

Government
  - Type: Municipality

Population (2017)
  - Total: 2,159
- Name meaning: "The monastery of the negroes"

Deir as-Sudan (Arabic: دير السودان) is a Palestinian town in the Ramallah and al-Bireh Governorate of Palestine, located 20 kilometers northwest of Ramallah in the northern West Bank. According to the Palestinian Central Bureau of Statistics (PCBS), the town had a population of approximately 2,159 inhabitants in 2017.

== Location ==
Deir as Sudan is located 14.7 kilometers (9.1 mi) northwest of Ramallah. It is bordered by Ajjul to the east, Bani Zeid al-Sharqiya to the north, Kafr Ein to the west, Umm Safa and An Nabi Salih to the south.

== History ==
Ceramic sherds from the Byzantine, Crusader/Ayyubid and Mamluk eras have been found here.

=== Ottoman era ===
In 1517, the village was included in the Ottoman Empire with the rest of Palestine, and in the 1596 tax-records it appeared as Dair Sudan, located in the Nahiya of Quds of the Liwa of Al-Quds. The population was 14 households, all Muslim. They paid a fixed tax rate of 33,3% on agricultural products, such as wheat, barley, olive trees, vineyards/fruit trees, goats and beehives, in addition to occasional revenues; a total of 3,400 akçe. Pottery from the early Ottoman era have also been found here.

In 1838, it was noted as a Muslim village in the Beni Zeid district, north of Jerusalem.

An Ottoman village list of about 1870 indicated 22 houses and a population of 90, though the population count included men, only.

In 1882, the PEF's Survey of Western Palestine (SWP) described Deir es Sudan as: "A village of moderate size, with a well to the west, on the slope of a hill, with olive-groves round it."

In 1896 the population of Der es-sudan was estimated to be about 153 persons.

=== British Mandate era ===
In the 1922 census of Palestine, conducted by the British Mandate authorities, the village, named Dair Al-Sudan, had a population of 173, all Muslim, increasing in the 1931 census to 243 Muslims, in 53 houses.

In the 1945 statistics the population of Deir es Sudan was 280 Muslims, with 4,498 dunams (4.5 km^{2}; 1.7 sq mi) of land under their jurisdiction, according to an official land and population survey. Of this, 2,416 dunams were plantations and irrigable land, 841 were for cereals, while 15 dunams (1.5 ha; 3.7 acres) were built-up (urban) land.

=== Jordanian era ===
In the wake of the 1948 Arab–Israeli War, and after the 1949 Armistice Agreements, Deir as-Sudan came under Jordanian rule.

The Jordanian census of 1961 found 486 inhabitants in Deir as-Sudan.

=== 1967-present ===
Since the Six-Day War in 1967, Deir as-Sudan has been under Israeli occupation.

After the 1995 accords, 57.2% of the village's total area has been defined as Area A land, 6.5% as Area B land, while the remaining 36.3% is Area C.

== Bibliography ==
- Barron, J.B., ed. (1923). Palestine: Report and General Abstracts of the Census of 1922. Government of Palestine.
- Conder, C.R.; Kitchener, H.H. (1882). The Survey of Western Palestine: Memoirs of the Topography, Orography, Hydrography, and Archaeology. Vol. 2. London: Committee of the Palestine Exploration Fund.
- Dauphin, C. (1998). La Palestine byzantine, Peuplement et Populations. BAR International Series 726 (in French). Vol. III : Catalogue. Oxford: Archeopress. ISBN 0-860549-05-4.
- Finkelstein, I.; Lederman, Zvi, eds. (1997). Highlands of many cultures. Tel Aviv: Institute of Archaeology of Tel Aviv University Publications Section. ISBN 965-440-007-3.
- Government of Jordan, Department of Statistics (1964). First Census of Population and Housing. Volume I: Final Tables; General Characteristics of the Population (PDF).
- Government of Palestine, Department of Statistics (1945). Village Statistics, April, 1945.
- Hadawi, S. (1970). Village Statistics of 1945: A Classification of Land and Area ownership in Palestine. Palestine Liberation Organization Research Center.
- Hartmann, M. (1883). "Die Ortschaftenliste des Liwa Jerusalem in dem türkischen Staatskalender für Syrien auf das Jahr 1288 der Flucht (1871)". Zeitschrift des Deutschen Palästina-Vereins. 6: 102–149.
- Hütteroth, W.-D.; Abdulfattah, K. (1977). Historical Geography of Palestine, Transjordan and Southern Syria in the Late 16th Century. Erlanger Geographische Arbeiten, Sonderband 5. Erlangen, Germany: Vorstand der Fränkischen Geographischen Gesellschaft. ISBN 3-920405-41-2.
- Mills, E., ed. (1932). Census of Palestine 1931. Population of Villages, Towns and Administrative Areas. Jerusalem: Government of Palestine.
- Palmer, E.H. (1881). The Survey of Western Palestine: Arabic and English Name Lists Collected During the Survey by Lieutenants Conder and Kitchener, R. E. Transliterated and Explained by E.H. Palmer. Committee of the Palestine Exploration Fund.
- Robinson, E.; Smith, E. (1841). Biblical Researches in Palestine, Mount Sinai and Arabia Petraea: A Journal of Travels in the year 1838. Vol. 3. Boston: Crocker & Brewster.
- Schick, C. (1896). "Zur Einwohnerzahl des Bezirks Jerusalem". Zeitschrift des Deutschen Palästina-Vereins. 19: 120–127.
- Socin, A. (1879). "Alphabetisches Verzeichniss von Ortschaften des Paschalik Jerusalem". Zeitschrift des Deutschen Palästina-Vereins. 2: 135–163.
