= Ateret =

Israeli settlement in the West Bank

Ateret: עטרת (Hebrew)
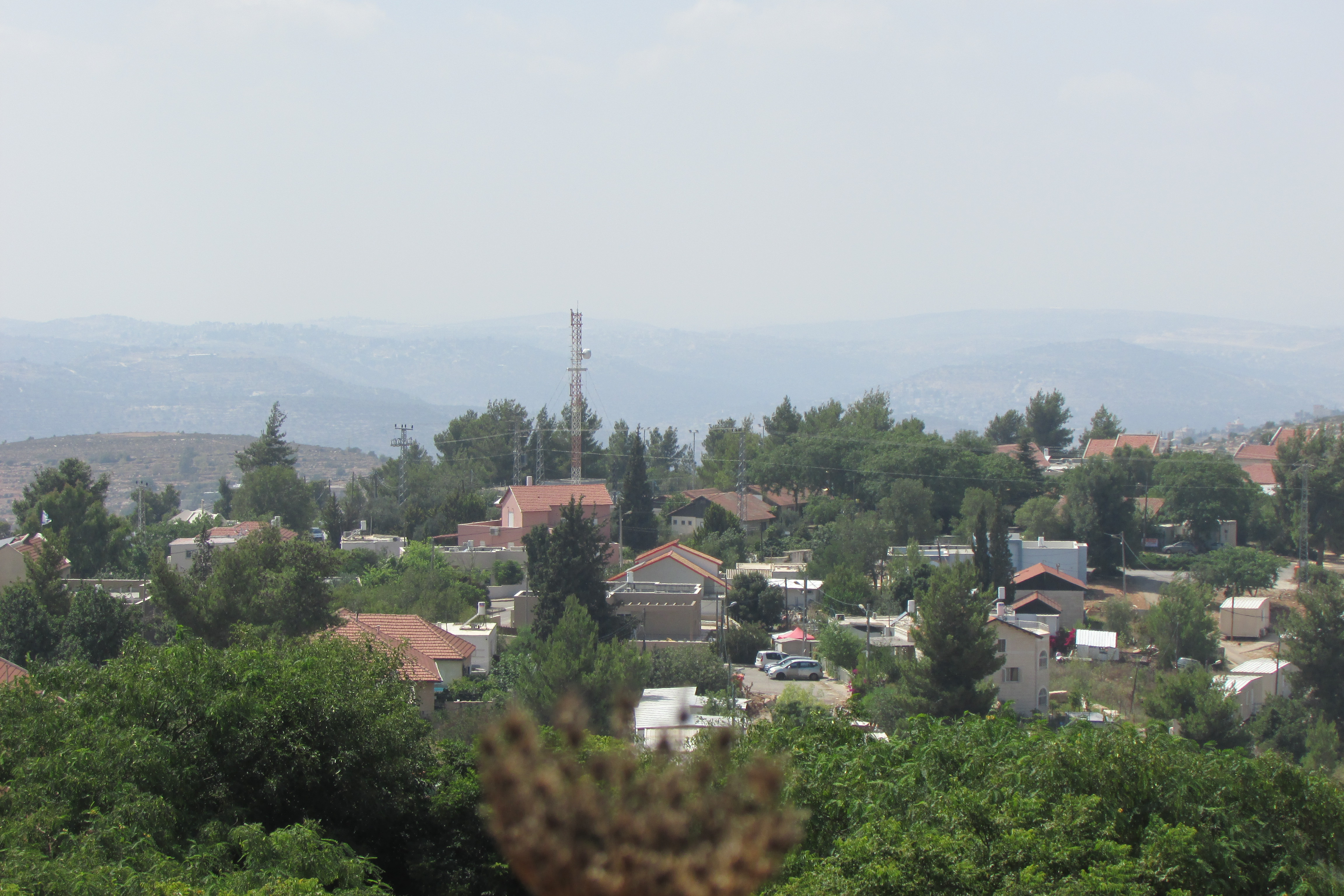
- Etymology: Crown
- Location within the Central West Bank Location within the West Bank
- Coordinates: 31°59′59″N 35°10′37″E
- Country: Palestine
- District: Judea and Samaria Area
- Council: Mateh Binyamin
- Region: West Bank
- Founded: 1981
- Founder: Residents of Petah Tikva
- Population (2024): 716

Ateret (Hebrew: עטרת, lit. 'Crown') is an Israeli settlement organized as a community settlement in the West Bank. Located in the municipal jurisdiction of the Mateh Binyamin Regional Council, it is located on a hilltop, at an elevation of 760 metres. In 2024 it had a population of 716.

The international community considers Israeli settlements in the West Bank illegal under international law, but the Israeli government disputes this.

== Etymology ==
Initially, the locality was called Neve Tzof B, due to its proximity to the existing Neve Tzuf locality . Later, the name "Ateret" was given, in connection with the name of the biblical city "Atarot" in the land of the Tribe of Ephraim. This is due to the proximity to the village of Atara, which preserves this name.

== History ==
The village was founded in August 1981 by a group, led by Tzvi Halamish, of eight families and a few singles.

According to ARIJ, Israel confiscated land from three nearby Palestinian villages in order to construct Ateret:

- 363 dunams from Ajjul,
- 163 dunums from 'Atara, and
- 186 dunams from Umm Safa.
