= Bani Zeid al-Gharbia =

Bani Zeid
- Municipality type C

Arabic transcription(s)
  - Arabic: بني زيد
  - Latin: Bani Zeid al-Gharbiyya (official); Bani Zayd; Bani Zaid; West Bani Zeid (unofficial)
- Location of Bani Zeid within Palestine
- Coordinates: 32°02′28″N 35°06′6″E
- Palestine grid: 159/161
- State: State of Palestine
- Governorate: Ramallah and al-Bireh

Government
  - Type: Municipality
  - Head of Municipality: Abdel Karim Abu Aql

Population (2017)
  - Total: 6,027
- Name meaning: "[the] Zaid Tribe"

Bani Zeid (Arabic: بني زيد) is a Palestinian town in the Ramallah and al-Bireh Governorate of Palestine, in the north-central West Bank, located 27 kilometers (17 mi) northwest of Ramallah, about 45 kilometers northwest of Jerusalem and about 6 kilometers (3.7 mi) southwest of Salfit. A town of over 6,000 inhabitants, Bani Zeid was founded when the villages of Deir Ghassaneh and Beit Rima merged to form a municipality in 1966 during Jordanian rule over the West Bank.

Bani Zeid owes its name to the Arab tribe that was granted the area as a fief by the Ayyubid sultan Saladin in the 12th century for having served in the Muslim army during the first Crusades. It was settled by members of the tribe alongside the native fellahin ("peasantry") during the reign of Mamluk sultan Baibars in the mid-13th century. During Ottoman rule, the area of Bani Zeid served as a sheikdom with some administrative capacity. It consisted of several villages with Deir Ghassaneh as its center. During that time, the Barghouti family dominated the sheikdom.

During the 1936–39 Arab revolt against British Mandate rule, Deir Ghassaneh primarily served as the scene of rebel gatherings and British military raids. In 1967, Bani Zeid was occupied by Israel during the Six-Day War, but was later transferred to full Palestinian security and administrative control in 2000. The next year it became the first Palestinian-controlled town to be known as the site of major operation by Israeli forces during the Second Intifada. When Fathiya Barghouti Rheime was elected mayor in 2005, Bani Zeid became the first Palestinian locality with a woman as head of the municipality, in concurrence with nearby Ramallah.

Historically, Bani Zeid's economy was dependent on the olive crop, which was supplied to soap factories in Nablus. Until the present day, olive trees cover most of the town's cultivable land. However, the residents of Bani Zeid today largely derive their income from employment in the civil service and private business. There are a number of archaeological sites in Bani Zeid, including the old town of Deir Ghassaneh, the manor of Sheikh Salih al-Barghouti and the maqam ("saintly person's tomb") of Sheikh al-Khawwas.

== Etymology ==
=== Deir Ghassaneh ===
English orientalist Edward Henry Palmer (1840–1882) thought the name Deir Ghassaneh meant "The monastery of the Ghassaneh" in Arabic, better known today as Ghassanids, and deir meaning "monastery". However, according to Moshe Sharon (b. 1937), Israeli professor of Islamic history and civilisation, this claim has been dismissed by a number of researchers since the Ghassanids did not have a history of settlement in Samaria, the modern-day northern West Bank. Sharon suggests that the name of the village is related to the Arabic word ghassaneh, which means "very handsome" or suggests "youth and beauty".

=== Beit Rima ===
Beit Rima means "The house of Rima".

== History ==
=== Archaeological record ===
In Beit Rima, sherds from the Iron Age I and IA II, Persian, Hellenistic, Roman, Byzantine, Crusader/Ayyubid, Mamluk and Early Ottoman remains have been found.

In Deir Ghassaneh, sherds from all of the same periods, except the Persian one, have also been found. Small fragments of a marble column were found in Deir Ghassaneh.

=== In the Hebrew Bible and New Testament ===
Deir Ghassaneh has been identified as the ancient Saredah (also spelled Zeredah), hometown of King Jeroboam I of Israel (1 Kings 11:26).

I. M. Casanowicz argued in 1915 for its identification with Arimathea (Greek: Αριμαθεα), the home of Joseph of Arimathea, although others identify that city with Ramla. However, Ramla is a medieval town only founded around 705–715 by the Umayyad Caliphate.

=== Roman period ===
In the compendium of Jewish oral law known as the Mishnah (compiled in 189 CE), Beit Rima is mentioned as a place where Jews formerly produced a high-quality grape wine, and which was brought as an oblation (contribution) to the Temple in Jerusalem.

=== Byzantine period ===
Byzantine ceramics have been found in Deir Ghassaneh, and on the north side of Beit Rima. According to some sources, it was settled by the Ghassanids, an Arab Christian tribal confederation, after it was abandoned by the Israelites.

=== Early Muslim period ===
According to Sharon, there is no mention of Deir Ghassaneh or Beit Rima in early Arabic sources.

=== Ayyubid period: Bani Zeid tribe in Palestine ===
The modern town of Bani Zeid receives its name from the Arab tribe of Bani Zeid, which settled in Palestine during the Ayyubid period in the late 12th century. They formed part of the Bedouin units of Saladin's army that hailed from the Hejaz. After the siege of Jerusalem in 1187, Saladin's forces captured the city and the Ayyubid army was garrisoned there. The Bani Zeid temporarily resided in Jerusalem and a street, located near the present-day al-Sa'idia Street, was named after them, but has since been renamed.

In order for Saladin to persuade the Hejazi Arab tribes that joined his army to remain in Palestine, he offered each tribe a cluster of villages captured from the Crusaders as iqta' (fiefs) to settle in and control. The Bani Zeid were granted the villages of Deir Ghassaneh and Beit Rima, as well as the nearby towns of Kafr Ein and Qarawa. However, the Bani Zeid tribe only settled there after another century.

=== Mamluk period ===
It was not until 1293, after the Bahri Mamluks under Sultan Baibars conquered the coastal strip of Palestine and expelled the last of the Crusaders, that the Bani Zeid tribe settled in the villages offered to them a century earlier by Saladin.

It is known that Deir Ghassaneh was inhabited during the Mamluk period due to the many houses there that have preserved elements of Mamluk architecture. Specific examples include the use of the ablaq technique of alternating stones of different colors, particularly red and white, that decorate the facades and gates of some houses.

A Mamluk-era (1260–1516) stone inscription belonging to an unidentified building in Deir Ghassaneh dating from 1330 describes a two-story "felicitous palace" with a garden. The palace was apparently an asset of the Sultan al-Nasir Muhammad and was inspected by Isa Muhammad al-Qaymari, a low-ranking emir from the Mosul region in charge of overseeing the personal assets of the sultan. In 1480 Deir Ghassaneh-based tribesmen from the Bani Zeid attacked Jerusalem as retaliation for the governor's execution of some of its members who had been accused of revolting against the Burji Mamluk authorities.

=== Early Ottoman period ===
During the Ottoman era in Palestine, the area where the Bani Zeid tribe settled became the nahiya (subdistrict) of Bani Zeid, part of the larger sanjak (district) of Quds (Jerusalem). The nahiya contained over 20 towns and villages and had jurisdiction over a part of Salfit. While these villages were registered and organized like other villages in the Jerusalem Sanjak, they were also treated as a group. Each village was led by a ra'is (local chief) and the entire Bani Zeid Nahiya was headed by a sheikh (paramount chief). The Bani Zeid sheikdom would serve as a political-administrative unit for the purposes of tax collection and army mobilization.

In 1556 the sheikdom was led by Sheikh Abu Rayyan bin Sheikh Manna, who was succeeded by Sheikh Muhammad Abu Rabban in 1560. Olive oil was the primary commodity that Bani Zeid Nahiya produced and the product was sold to local Ottoman officials and soap factories in Nablus. The Ottomans imposed taxes on olive oil, wheat and barley, and the sheikh was responsible for paying the revenues of collected taxes to the Ottoman authorities. In addition, Bani Zeid was required to finance a waqf (religious endowment) to the al-Aqsa Mosque in Jerusalem and the Ibrahimi Mosque in Hebron. In 1596 both Deir Ghassaneh and Beit Rima appeared in Ottoman tax registers and both villages paid taxes on wheat, barley, olive trees, fruit trees, vineyards, goats and/or beehives. Deir Ghassaneh had a population of 76 households, all Muslim, while Beit Rima had 54 Muslim households and 14 Christian households. During the course of the 16th century, most of Beit Rima's Christian inhabitants had emigrated from the village to Jerusalem, Ramla and Gaza, although the Christian population that remained continued to grow.

=== Nineteenth century ===
In the 19th century Bani Zeid was one of about two dozen sheikdoms in the central highlands of Palestine. While its exact borders varied from time to time, it was generally marked by the Wadi al-Dilb stream to the south, which separated it from the Bani Harith al-Shamali sheikdom, and the Wadi Nattif stream to the north that separated it from Bilad Jamma'in. The Bani Zeid sheikdom contained the highest slopes and the largest concentration of mountain faults of all the highland sheikdoms. About two-thirds of its villages were situated on relatively wide hilltops while the remainder were built along slopes. None were located in the valleys or the foothills. In 1838 English biblical scholars Edward Robinson and Eli Smith noted that the Bani Zeid Nahiya consisted of 18 inhabited localities and four khirbas (abandoned or ruined villages). They classified Deir Ghassaneh and Beit Rima as inhabited by Muslims. Residents from the al-Ramahi clan of Deir Ghassana settled al-Muzayri'a near Ramla, establishing it as a dependency, or satellite village, of their home village.

In the early 19th century, the paramount sheikhs of Bani Zeid were Sheikh Marif al-Barghouti and Sheikh 'Asi al-Rabbah Barghouti. They belonged to the wealthy noble family of al-Barghouti, a sub-clan of the Bani Zeid tribe that traditionally provided the leaders of the sheikdom. Its members were generally referred to as Baraghithah and the clan consisted of nine branches whose collective power extended beyond the Bani Zeid sheikdom to the coastal plain of Palestine. During the period of Khedivate Egyptian rule in the Levant (1832–1840), Sheikh 'Abd al-Jabir al-Barghouti, a nephew of Sheikh Marif, served as the chief of the Bani Zeid. Sheikh 'Abd al-Jabir belonged to the al-Zahir branch of the family which was based in Deir Ghassaneh. Deir Ghassaneh served as the sheikdom's qaryat al-kursi (throne village or capital). During the early part of Egyptian rule, Governor Ibrahim Pasha had Sheikh 'Abd al-Jabir executed. He was succeeded by Sheikh Ali al-Rabbah, another leading Barghouti sheikh and a son of Sheikh Asi. The latter was also subsequently executed on the orders of Ibrahim Pasha. Both sheikhs and their peasant fighters had fought against Egyptian rule during the 1834 Peasants' Revolt that spread throughout Palestine. During the last years of Egyptian control, Sheikh Musa Ahmad al-Sahwil of Abwein became the paramount sheikh of the Bani Zeid and continued to exercise great influence over the sheikdom when the Egyptian military withdrew from Palestine in 1841.

In the second half of the 19th century Bani Zeid was officially ruled by Sheikh Salih al-Barghouti, although he struggled to maintain full authority over the sheikdom, having to contend with his Abwein-based rival Sheikh Musa and his family, al-Sahwil. The latter controlled seven villages in the eastern part of the sheikdom, while the Barghouti maintained control over twelve villages in the western part. The two domains were separated by a wadi (seasonal stream). Nonetheless, Sheikh Salih enjoyed high political and social status, holding the official title of sheikh al-nahiya (chief of the subdistrict) and was also referred to locally as sheikh al-mashayikh (chief of the chieftains). The title ceased to be recognized by the Istanbul-based central government in 1864, but locally the title continued to demonstrate the guise of official authority. As sheikh al-nahiya, Sheikh Salih was tasked with the nomination and dismissal of makhatir (village headmen) and maintaining order through local custom. He also served as the multazim (tax collector) of the Bani Zeid sheikdom on behalf of the Ottoman authorities, despite the ban on tax-farming in 1853. This role in particular enabled the Barghouti clan to acquire vast wealth and property either forcefully or through legal transfer. During previous inter-family disputes, members of the clan had begun to settle in the surrounding villages of Beit Rima, Kobar and Deir Nidham.

As members of the Qais tribo-political faction, in opposition to the Yaman faction, the Barghouti aligned themselves with Qaisi-affiliated Bedouin tribes and other prominent families, including the Khalidi clan of Jerusalem, the 'Amr, 'Azza and 'Amla clans of the Hebron area and the Samhan clan of the Bani Harith nahiya to the north. In 1855–1856 tensions between Sheikh Salih and the leading families of Nablus broke out into fierce clashes. Sheikh Salih was eventually able to compel the Ottoman authorities to take the local rulers of Nablus to task. The restive sheikhs of the Jerusalem and Hebron regions were called to Damascus to conclude a lasting peace, but all were condemned to exile in Trabzon, northern Anatolia, with the exception of Sheikh Salih who apparently impressed the governor and was allowed to return to Deir Ghassaneh. The Barghouti clan would later support the Dar Hammad tribe against the Dar Hamid, both of which were engaged in a feud in nearby Silwad. In one day of fighting, 20 men were killed, prompting Sureya Pasha, the governor of Jerusalem, to personally intervene with a detachment of Ottoman troops which forced both factions to withdraw.

French explorer Victor Guérin visited both Deir Ghassaneh and Beit Rima in 1863. He noted that the former had a population of roughly 900 and was built on a mountain overlooking hills filled with "magnificent" olive groves. Beit Rima had a smaller population of 350, and was situated on a high plateau covered with olive and fig groves. The houses of both villages were constructed from red and white stone masonry and the mosque in Deir Ghassaneh, which Guérin regarded as noteworthy, was built from black and white stone. The home of Deir Ghassaneh's sheikh, who maintained a level of sovereignty over about 15 villages and hamlets in the area, and the members of his family, were particularly large and sturdily built. According to Sharon, the sheikh Guérin had referred to was Sheikh Salih. It was around this time, in the late 1860s, that the prominent al-Husayni clan of Jerusalem unsuccessfully attempted to form an alliance with the Barghouti clan, initially through diplomatic means. Afterward, they commissioned their allies in Istanbul to launch a propaganda campaign against the Barghouti clan, accusing them of undermining the sultan. This allegation was evidenced by the disruption of Jerusalem's water supply by the peasant fighters of the Bani Zeid led by Sheikh Salih, who closed off the aqueduct from Solomon's Pools to the south of Bethlehem.

In the 1887 census the Bani Zeid sheikdom consisted of 24 villages with an estimated collective population of 7,700, including 400 Christians. According to the census, Deir Ghassaneh had 1,200 inhabitants living in 196 households, making it significantly larger than the surrounding localities. There were nine elite households, each of whose family head was recognized by the census as a sheikh. The local imam, Muhammad Shams al-Din al-Shaykh Hanafi, was Egyptian and one of five men in Deir Ghassaneh born outside the village. The PEF's Survey of Western Palestine (SWP) in the late 19th century stated Deir Ghassaneh was "a village on a ridge, with springs in the valley below. It is of moderate size, built of stone and has olives beneath it." The SWP described Beit Rima as "a small village on the summit of a ridge with wells to the west".

=== British Mandate ===
Sheikh Salih was succeeded by his son Umar Salih al-Barghouti, who aligned Bani Zeid with the Nashashibi clan of Jerusalem against the al-Husayni clan in the contest for political dominance in Palestine during the British Mandate period. In 1936, during the Arab revolt in Palestine, the British Air Force struck a group of 400 local militiamen gathered outside of Deir Ghassaneh, killing about 130 of the fighters. Later, in September 1938, the local rebel leadership held a meeting in the village where it was decided that Abd al-Rahim al-Hajj Muhammad and Arif Abd al-Raziq would each serve as general commander of the revolt on a rotational basis. Deir Ghassaneh was subsequently attacked by British forces backed by fighter planes when they were informed of the conference. A rebel commander, Muhammad al-Salih, was killed in the ensuing firefight. The British Mandate Antiquities Authority noted in a January 1947 report that Deir Ghassaneh was "built on a medieval site", and on a hill 500 meters (1,600 ft) west of the village was a two-domed shrine dedicated to a Sheikh Khawas.

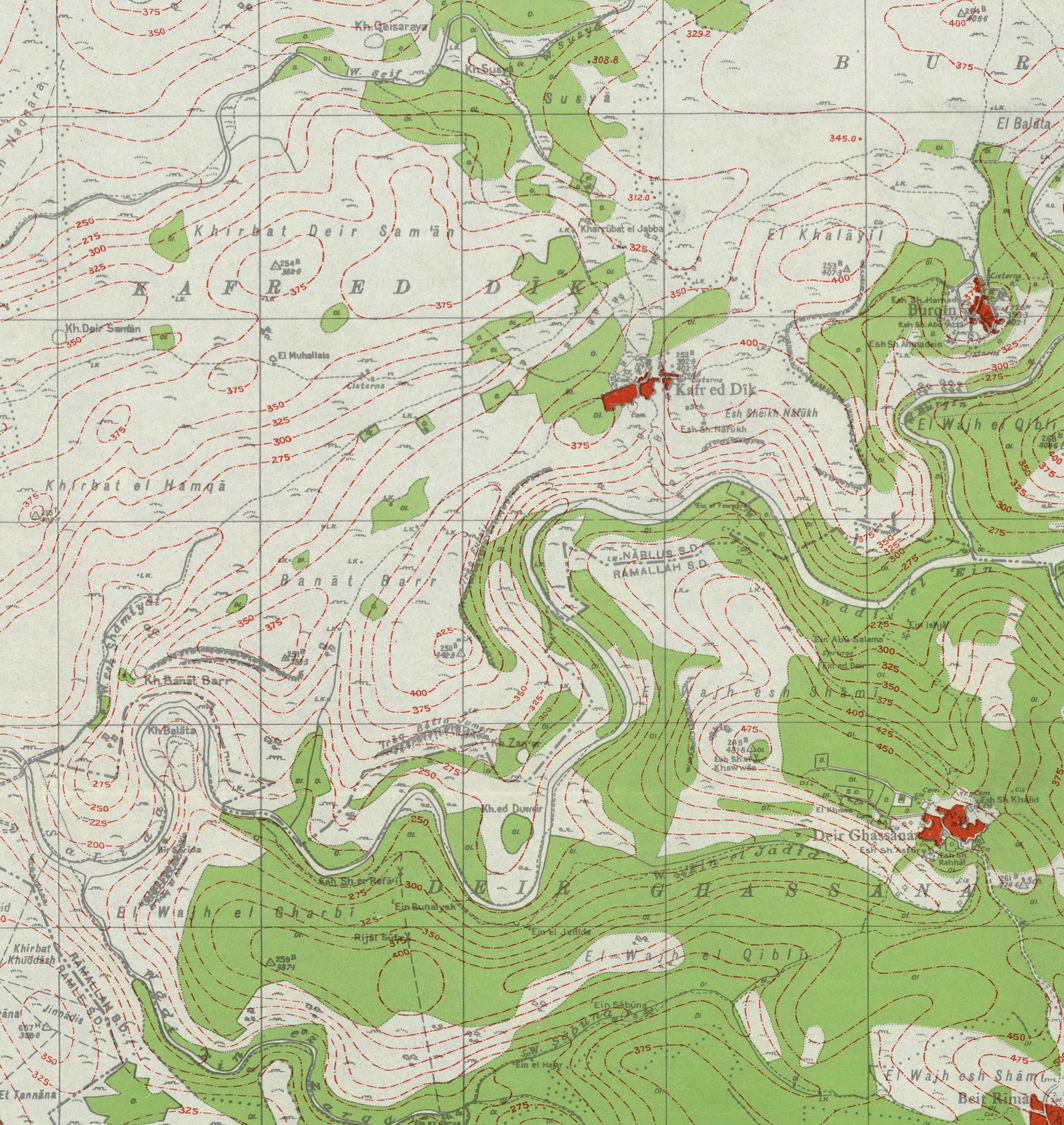
Deir Ghassana, (Beit Rima bottom left), 1943 1:20,000

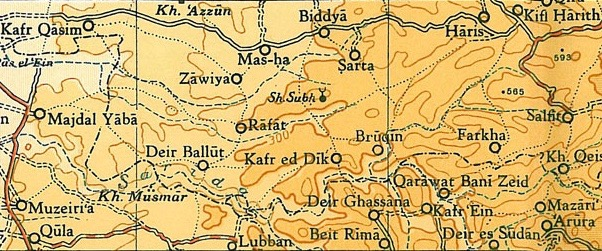
Deir Ghassana 1945 1:250,000

=== Jordanian period ===
Deir Ghassaneh and Beit Rima were merged and granted municipal status in February 1966 during Jordanian rule, partially due to the efforts of Kassim al-Rimawi, the rural affairs minister at the time and a native of Beit Rima. Its first mayor, Adib Mohammed Rimawi, was appointed by King Hussein. The municipality building is located in Beit Rima.

=== From 1967 until today ===
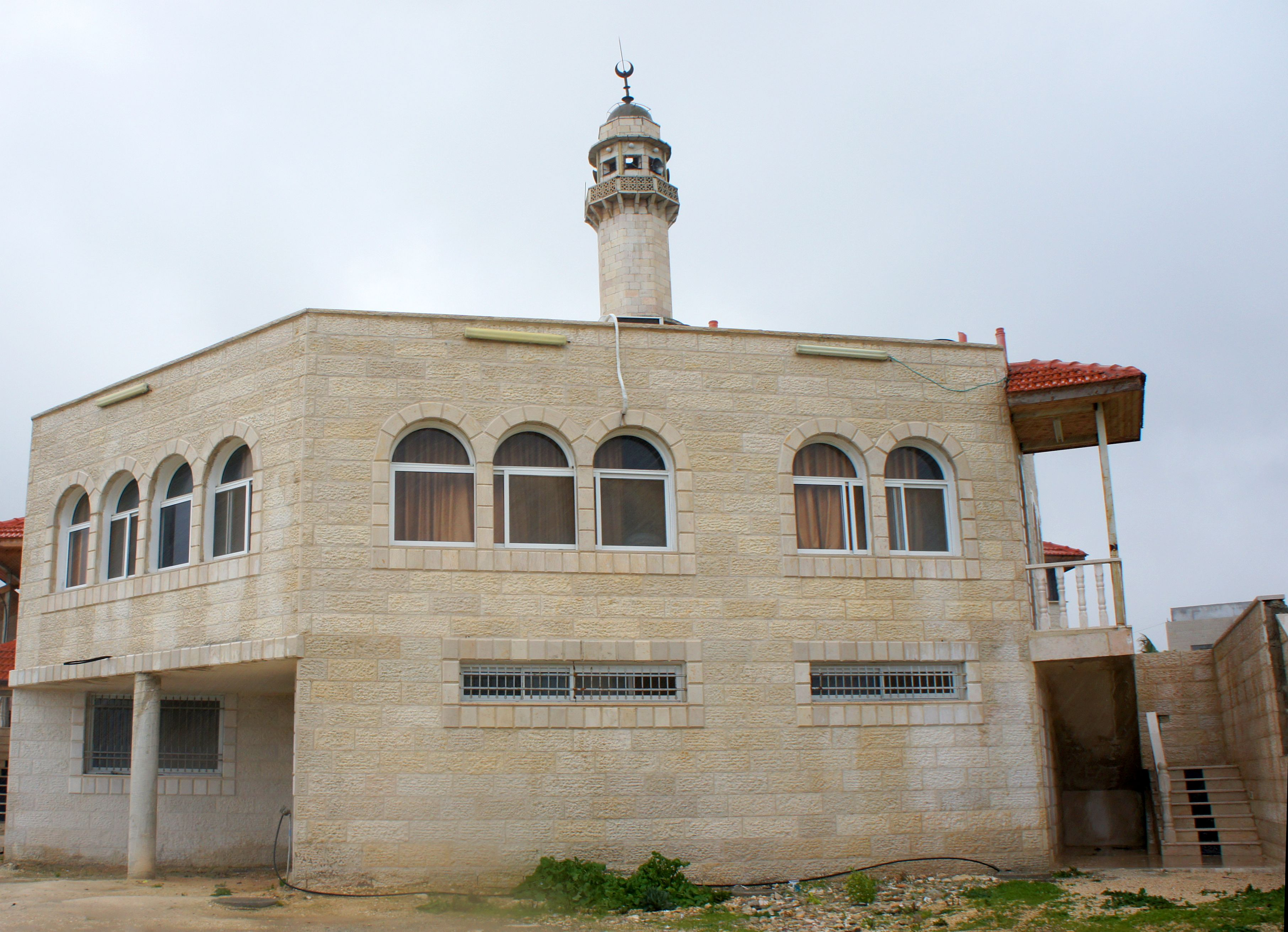
Mosque of Bani Zeid, 2012

In June 1967 Israel occupied the West Bank after defeating Arab forces in the Six-Day War. In 1972 the first municipal polls were held and Fa'eq Ali Rimawi was elected. In 1978 Bani Zeid was one of several Palestinian localities to append its municipal seal to the Memorandum from the masses and the institutions of the West Bank to the Executive Committee of the Palestine Liberation Organization in a display of unity with the Palestine Liberation Organization (PLO). The memorandum was a rejection of any solution, regardless of its origin, not containing a clear recognition of the right of the Palestinian people to self-determination and to establishing an independent Palestinian national state. In 2000 Bani Zeid was incorporated into Area A giving the Palestinian National Authority (PNA), the Palestinian governing body established after the Oslo Agreements with Israel in 1993, full control over security and civilian affairs in the town.

==== Second Intifada ====
In the late night hours of 24 October 2001, during the Second Intifada, the Israeli Army (IDF) launched an incursion into Beit Rima in what became the first major Israeli military raid into Palestinian-controlled territory, according to Human Rights Watch (HRW). The IDF stated the intent of the raid was to capture the alleged killers of Israeli Tourism Minister Rehavam Ze'evi, who was shot dead by members of the Popular Front for the Liberation of Palestine (PFLP) in retaliation for Israel's assassination of the party's leader Mustafa Zibri (Abu Ali Mustafa) in August. About 50 people from Beit Rima were detained and brought to the Israeli settlement of Halamish for interrogation. Most were released before the day's end, but eleven men remained in Israeli custody, two of whom Israel alleged to be directly involved in Ze'evi's assassination. In the course of the raid, Israeli forces killed six Palestinians, including three members of the Palestinian National Security Forces and two officers from the Civil Police, and wounded seven others. The Palestinian authorities in Beit Rima stated they had not received prior warning from the IDF and their slain men had been resting in an olive grove near the local police station, while Israeli military officials stated all those killed had either fired on Israeli forces or approached them threateningly and all were members of various armed groups. The HRW stated that the Red Crescent was prevented from treating the injured men until 7:00 am, a delay that resulted in the death of two of the police officers. Israeli forces also demolished three homes in the town, alleging that they belonged to family members of Ze'evi's killers.

== Geography ==
Bani Zeid is situated in the central highlands of the West Bank, off the southwestern cliffs of the mountainous spine that runs from the Hebron Hills to Jenin. It has an average elevation of 510 meters (1,670 ft) above sea level. The northern part of the town (Deir Ghassaneh) is built on a hilltop with an elevation of roughly 450 meters above sea level. It overlooks the Wadi al-Saredah stream 1 kilometer (0.62 mi) to the north. Bani Zeid is located 17.5 kilometers (10.9 mi) north of Ramallah and less than 45 kilometers (28 mi) northwest of Jerusalem. Nearby localities include Kafr ad-Dik and Bruqin to the north, Qarawat Bani Zeid to the northeast, Kafr Ein to the east, Nabi Salih to the southeast, Deir Nidham and the Israeli settlement of Halamish to the south, Aboud to the southwest, al-Lubban al-Gharbi and the settlement of Beit Aryeh to the west and the settlement of Peduel to the northwest.

Bani Zeid had a total land area of 22,249 dunams in 1945, of which 90 dunams were classified as built-up areas (Deir Ghassaneh was larger than Beit Rima) and 8,400 dunams were planted with olive or fig groves. Today the Bani Zeid municipality has a jurisdiction of over 21,979 dunams, of which 80.6% is cultivable land. today Beit Rima is the larger village. The built-up areas of the town constitute 918 dunams, 832 of which is geared towards residential areas while the remaining 86 is used for commercial, industrial and transportation purposes. The town is surrounded by olive groves, which Bani Zeid is well known for, and 14,505 dunams are planted with olive trees. The old village center of Deir Ghassaneh consists of three quarters: Harat al-Barghouti (Harat al-Fauqa), Harat al-Shu'aibi and Harat al-Tahtani.

The average annual rainfall in the town is 592.9 millimeters (23.34 in) and average annual humidity is roughly 62%. Average temperature is 17.4 °C (63.3 °F).

=== Climate ===
Climate data for Bani Zeid, Palestine 480m (1985–2016 normals), (Note: Mean monthly maxima and minima (i.e. the expected highest and lowest temperature readings at any point during the year or given month) calculated based on data at said location from 1985 to 2016.)
Month	Jan	Feb	Mar	Apr	May	Jun	Jul	Aug	Sep	Oct	Nov	Dec	Year
Mean daily maximum °F (°C)	59 (15)	61 (16)	66 (19)	75 (24)	82 (28)	86 (30)	90 (32)	90 (32)	86 (30)	81 (27)	72 (22)	64 (18)	75.96 (24.42)
Mean daily minimum °F (°C)	41 (5)	43 (6)	45 (7)	50 (10)	55 (13)	59 (15)	63 (17)	64 (18)	64 (18)	59 (15)	52 (11)	45 (7)	53.2 (11.8)
Source: MeteoBlue (Climate Bani Zayd)

== Demographics ==
Ottoman village statistics from 1870 showed that "Der Ghassana" had 164 houses and a population of 559, while "Bet Rima" had 60 houses and a population of 220, though in both cases the population count included only men. In the Ottoman census of 1887, Deir Ghassaneh's population of 196 households (roughly 1,200 people) was homogeneous, everyone being Muslim, and with the exception of five individuals, all the males had been born in the village. The estimated 9% of the inhabitants who were born outside the village were almost exclusively women, with one fifth of all females hailing primarily from other villages in the Bani Zeid nahiya such as Beit Rima, Abwein, Kobar and Kafr Ein and about 14 women originating from other parts of Palestine, particularly al-Majdal Ascalon. Several men from Deir Ghassaneh settled in the surrounding villages, namely Beit Rima, Deir Nidham and Nabi Salih. In 1896 the population of Der Ghisane was estimated to be 1,341, while Bet Rima had an estimated 480 inhabitants.

In the 1922 census of Palestine, conducted by the British Mandatory authorities, "Dair Ghassaneh" had a population of 625, while "Bait Rema" had a population of 555, all Muslims. In the 1931 census Deir Ghassaneh had 181 occupied houses and a population of 753, while Beit Rima had had 175 occupied houses and a population of 746, still all Muslim. In a land and population survey by Sami Hadawi in 1945 both villages had a total population of 1,810. Beit Rima had a slightly larger population, but Deir Ghassaneh had a larger land area. In a 1961 census by Jordanian authorities, Deir Ghassaneh's population reached 1,461, but it declined drastically after more than half of the residents fled during the Six-Day War in June 1967. In 1982 there were 892 inhabitants in the town. Beit Rima had 2,165 inhabitants in 1961 and unlike Deir Ghassaneh, the population continued to grow, reaching 3,451 in 1987.

In the first census taken by the Palestinian Central Bureau of Statistics (PCBS) in 1997, Bani Zeid had a population of 4,351 inhabitants. The gender make-up was 51.8% male and 49.2% female. More than half of the population was under the age of 20 (51.1%), while 27.7% were between the ages of 20 and 39, 15% between the ages of 40 and 64, and the remainder of the population being 65 or older (6%). Palestinian refugees made up 6.8% of the residents in 1997.

According to the PCBS census of 2007, Bani Zeid had a population of 5,515, of which 49% were males and 51% females. There were 1,176 housing units and the average size of a household was five family members. The town's principal clans are al-Rimawi, al-Barghouti, al-Shu'aibi, al-Ramahi and Mashaal, although there are also a number of smaller families. Today, there are three mosques in the town, the Bani Zeid Mosque, the Abu Bakr al-Siddiq Mosque and the Omar ibn al-Khattab Mosque. By 2017, the population was 6,027.

== Economy and education ==
Historically, Deir Ghassaneh depended primarily on olive cultivation, and until the present day most of Bani Zeid's cultivable land is covered by olive orchards. The cultivation of other fruit trees is significantly lower, with almonds being a distant second at 240 dunams. Other crops grown include grains which cover 135 dunams and onions, dry legumes and fodder to a lesser degree. Only 1% of the town's residents own livestock and according to the Palestinian Ministry of Agriculture, there were 1,880 goats, 268 sheep, 12 cows and 281 beehives in Bani Zeid in 2009. Agriculture currently accounts for 10% of labor in the town.

Today, employment by the Palestinian government and private businesses is the dominant economic activity in Bani Zeid, making up around 70% of the town's workforce. The trade sector accounts for 10% of the labor force, followed by the industrial sector which makes up 8%. Work in the Israeli labor market employs around 2% of the working population. Unemployment in the town was at 20% in 2011. According to the Bani Zeid Municipality, there are 26 grocery stores, 26 public service venues, 11 workshops, a bakery, a butchery and two olive oil presses in the town.

A school was founded in Deir Ghassaneh in 1925. Prior to the British Mandate period, boys would normally receive education in a kuttab, an elementary-type school with Islamic law and tradition having a major influence on the curriculum. Today, there is one elementary school (Bani Zeid Elementary School) and one secondary school (Bashir al-Barghouti Secondary School) in the town of Bani Zeid, both run by the government. According to the Palestinian Ministry of Education and Higher Education, in the 2010-2011 academic year there were 26 classes occupied by 691 students, both male and female. There was 45 teaching staff. There are no kindergartens in Bani Zeid. The closest institution for higher learning is Birzeit University in the village of Bir Zeit to the southeast.

According to the PCBS, in 2007 94.5% of the population over the age of 10 was literate. Of that demographic segment, 21.7% received elementary education, 24.8% received primary education and 20.2% had secondary education. Over 15% had completed some form of higher education (617 persons), with 248 attaining associate degrees, 324 attaining bachelor's degrees and 45 obtaining higher diplomas.

== Governance ==
Bani Zeid is governed by a municipal council of 13 members, including the chairman (mayor) and vice-chairman, under the name Municipality of West Bani Zaid. In normal circumstances the town holds election every four years. In the 2005 elections, the Hamas-affiliated party won five municipal seats, including the post of mayor, which was won by a female candidate Fathiya Barghouti Rheime who, along with Janet Mikhail of Ramallah, became the first woman to hold the post of a Palestinian municipality head. The Fatah list won five seats, the Palestinian People's Party (PPP) list won one, and a socialist party won the remaining seat.

During an Israeli raid in Bani Zeid in 2007, two Hamas party members in the municipal council were arrested by Israeli authorities along with dozens of other Palestinian mayors, parliament members and ministers belonging to Hamas throughout the West Bank.

In the most recent polls in 2012, Abdel Karim Abu Aql was elected mayor on a leftist alliance list as were the other 12 people elected to the council. The elections were boycotted by Hamas. Bani Zeid has had six mayors since the establishment of the municipality in 1966.

The municipal council takes part in the international town twinning scheme, and have twinned with Bezons in France.

== Religious sites ==
One of the notable characteristics of Deir Ghassaneh was the concentration of 16 local Muslim shrines or saintly-person tombs (maqam, pl. maqamat) in its vicinity which served as visitation sites for the pre-20th-century Palestinian community. According to author and ethnographer Johann Bussow, their locations near Jerusalem also "contributed to the image of an Islamic Holy Land," which brought further prosperity to the inhabitants of the villages of Bani Zeid who benefited from providing services to pilgrims. The Barghouti family served as patrons for the various religious sheikhs who oversaw the shrines. The maqamat were dedicated either to prophets (anbah) recognized by the Qur'an or saintly-persons known as welys, whom locals believed had been "close to God." The veneration of the wely's tombs, a common feature in peasant life, did not derive from the orthodox Islam which was practiced more strictly in the urban centers, and was rooted in local pre-Islamic, including Christian, tradition.

All the maqamat of Bani Zeid were designed differently, with some being rustic tombstones and others built more elaborately. The latter types consisted of a domed mausoleum known as a qubba, a shelter known as a makan nawm, a garden, a well and either a distinguishable olive or oak tree. Most of the upkeep of the buildings was provided by awqaf ("religious endowments"). One of the shrines was considered by the local peasantry to be a place to safeguard firewood and outside the reach of potential thieves. The maqamat were also divided by status, with some bearing significance only to an individual village or clan and some collectively revered by the residents of the sheikhdom. Of all the sites in the Bani Zeid sheikhdom, the most venerated shrine was that of Nabi Salih, dedicated to the prophet (nabi) Salih, which held special significance beyond Bani Zeid.

=== Maqam al-Khawwas ===
One of the notable maqamat close to the modern town of Bani Zeid is Maqam al-Khawwas (var. Khawassi, Khawwas and Kawas), a double-domed building situated on a hilltop 500 meters west of Deir Ghassaneh, in an isolated area. Along with the maqamat of al-Rifa'i or al-Majdoub, Maqam al-Khawwas was a shrine of major importance for the Bani Zeid villages, collectively. The maqam honored what was locally considered to be the meditation site of al-Khawass, believed to be a Sufi holy man (wely) from Egypt who often visited the residents of the area.

It contained a mihrab ("niche indicating direction towards Mecca.") The maqam was noted by Guérin in 1863. Its eastern dome was constructed by the residents of Deir Ghassaneh, while local legend holds the western dome was completed by angels. The interior of the domes were simple and typical of most maqamat domes, lacking cross-vault roofing which was a common feature for most of Deir Ghassaneh's buildings. The sanctuary had a two-door entrance on its northern end. The interior walls were whitewashed, reflecting the Muslim tradition of heavenly light and spirit in the color white. A few verses from the Qur'an were written on parts of the walls. The tomb of al-Khawwas was covered in white cloth. A small niche on the western wall was fitted for an oil lamp.

An important feature that distinguished Maqam al-Khawwas from the Deir Ghassaneh mosque was that it acted primarily as a women's domain whereas the mosque had largely been a male domain. In the pre-British Mandate era, it was frequented by women on a daily basis and during a seasonal pilgrimage for women known as mawsim al-banat. During this pilgrimage, which coincided with the Nabi Salih pilgrimage, a largely male affair, large groups of women and children from the villages of Bani Zeid would visit the Khawwas mausoleum to celebrate festivities, socialize with other women and pray. According to Palestinian architecture expert Suad Amiry, Maqam al-Khawwas's isolation and the ritual of having to travel uphill to reach the sanctuary added to the tranquil feeling of the visit.

== Manor of Salih al-Barghouti ==
The late 19th-century chief of the Bani Zeid sheikhdom, Sheikh Salih al-Barghouti, resided in a large palace-like manor in Deir Ghassaneh. The first floor and portions of the second floor were originally built in 1602. In 1862-63 Sheikh Salih renovated the manor which became known locally as "Saraya al-Sheikh Salih al-Barghouti" and built the remainder of the second floor. The building was divided into three main components, namely the salamlek, the khazeen and the haramlek. The salamlek included a reception area, dining halls and a guesthouse while the khazeen consisted of workshops, food depots and horse stables. The haramlek, on the second floor, served as the living quarters for women and servants. Above the living quarters hung the sheikh's retreat and leisure area from which he could view his estates.

According to Amiry, Sheikh Salih's manor, along with other Barghouti family palace compounds, "was strongly influenced by urban architecture" in light of its "majestic scale, ornate fine stone work and the introverted spatial organisation." The manor, which has a rectangular ground plan, roughly measures 23 meters by 34 meters. An open courtyard occupied the central position of the manor. The courtyard was mostly enclosed by four partially open arcades known as riwaqs which either serves as stables or storage.

The main gate of the palace consists of two arches, with one being built within the other. According to Sharon, while this gate structure was common among village manors in the area, the gate of Sheikh Salih's palace was "particularly monumental" as the arch was pointed and contained one keystone. The entire arch was constructed in the ablaq style with alternating black and white stone. A large, heavy and decorated wooden door is fitted into the gate and it was used to receive vehicles or large loads while a smaller door for personal use was built in the center of the larger door. A smaller secondary entrance was located at the building's northern side, vertically parallel of the main entrance.

== Notable people ==
Members of the Barghouti clan come from the Ramallah and al-Bireh Governorate, which includes Bani Zeid; notable members of the clan include Bashir Barghouti, a Palestinian Communist leader and journalist; Abdullah Barghouti, a convicted Hamas bomber, and Mourid Barghouti a poet and writer. Other notable people born in Bani Zeid include Abdullah Rimawi, head of the Ba'ath Party in Jordan in the 1950s, Kassim al-Rimawi, prime minister of Jordan in 1980, and Mahmoud al-Rimawi, a journalist and author. Asaad Barghouti (1934-2009), PLO activist and member of parliament, and Mohammad Abdulsalam Barghouti, general secretary of the Arab Bank (1944-1952) are two more notables.

== Bibliography ==
- Amiry, S. (1987), Space, Kinship and Gender: The Social Dimension of Peasant Architecture in Palestine, University of Edinburgh-Faculty of Social Sciences, hdl:1842/6987
- Barron, J.B., ed. (1923). Palestine: Report and General Abstracts of the Census of 1922. Government of Palestine.
- Büssow, J. (2011). Hamidian Palestine: Politics and Society in the District of Jerusalem 1872-1908. BRILL. ISBN 978-9004205697.
- Carter, Charles Edward, ed. (1996). Community, Identity, and Ideology: Social Science Approaches to the Hebrew Bible. Eisenbrauns. ISBN 1575060051.
- Conder, C.R.; Kitchener, H. H. (1882). The Survey of Western Palestine: Memoirs of the Topography, Orography, Hydrography, and Archaeology. Vol. 2. London: Committee of the Palestine Exploration Fund.
- Dauphin, C. (1998). La Palestine byzantine, Peuplement et Populations. BAR International Series 726 (in French). Vol. III : Catalogue. Oxford: Archeopress. ISBN 0-860549-05-4.
- Department of Statistics (1945). Village Statistics, April, 1945. Government of Palestine.
- Finkelstein, I.; Lederman, Zvi, eds. (1997). Highlands of many cultures. Tel Aviv: Institute of Archaeology of Tel Aviv University Publications Section. ISBN 965-440-007-3.
- Hadawi, S. (1970). Village Statistics of 1945: A Classification of Land and Area ownership in Palestine. Palestine Liberation Organization Research Center.
- Hartmann, M. (1883). "Die Ortschaftenliste des Liwa Jerusalem in dem türkischen Staatskalender für Syrien auf das Jahr 1288 der Flucht (1871)". Zeitschrift des Deutschen Palästina-Vereins. 6: 102–149.
- Hütteroth, W.-D.; Abdulfattah, K. (1977). Historical Geography of Palestine, Transjordan and Southern Syria in the Late 16th Century. Erlanger Geographische Arbeiten, Sonderband 5. Erlangen, Germany: Vorstand der Fränkischen Geographischen Gesellschaft. ISBN 3-920405-41-2.
- Guérin, V. (1875). Description Géographique Historique et Archéologique de la Palestine (in French). Vol. 2: Samarie, pt. 2. Paris: L'Imprimerie Nationale.
- Macalister, R. A. Stewart; Masterman, E. W. G. (1905). "Occasional Papers on the Modern inhabitants of Palestine, part I & part II". Quarterly Statement - Palestine Exploration Fund. 37: 343–356. doi:10.1179/peq.1905.37.4.343. S2CID 161632875.
- Macalister, R. A. Stewart; Masterman, E. W. G. (1906). "Occasional Papers on the Modern inhabitants of Palestine, part III". Quarterly Statement - Palestine Exploration Fund. 38: 33–50. doi:10.1179/peq.1906.38.1.33.
- Mills, E., ed. (1932). Census of Palestine 1931. Population of Villages, Towns and Administrative Areas. Jerusalem: Government of Palestine.
- Palmer, E.H. (1881). The Survey of Western Palestine: Arabic and English Name Lists Collected During the Survey by Lieutenants Conder and Kitchener, R. E. Transliterated and Explained by E.H. Palmer. Committee of the Palestine Exploration Fund.
- Probert, Harry (2006). Bomber Harris: His Life and Times. MBI Publishing Company. ISBN 1-85367-691-8.
- Robinson, E.; Smith, E. (1841). Biblical Researches in Palestine, Mount Sinai and Arabia Petraea: A Journal of Travels in the year 1838. Vol. 3. Boston: Crocker & Brewster.
- Schick, C. (1896). "Zur Einwohnerzahl des Bezirks Jerusalem". Zeitschrift des Deutschen Palästina-Vereins. 19: 120–127.
- Sharon, M. (2004). Corpus Inscriptionum Arabicarum Palaestinae, D-F. Vol. 3. BRILL. ISBN 90-04-13197-3.
- Singer, A. (1994). Palestinian Peasants and Ottoman Officials: Rural Administration Around Sixteenth-Century Jerusalem. Cambridge University Press. ISBN 0-521-47679-8.
- Socin, A. (1879). "Alphabetisches Verzeichniss von Ortschaften des Paschalik Jerusalem". Zeitschrift des Deutschen Palästina-Vereins. 2: 135–163.
- Tamari, S. (Autumn 2002). "The Last Feudal Lord in Palestine". Jerusalem Quarterly (85). doi:10.70190/jq.I16.p27.
- Tamari, S. (2009). Mountain Against the Sea: Essays on Palestinian Society and Culture. Berkeley and: University of California. ISBN 978-0-520-25129-8.
