= Mahmoud al-Rimawy =

Palestinian journalist and author (born 1948)

Mahmoud al-Rimawy (Arabic: محمود الريماوي) (born 1948) is a Palestinian journalist and author.

== Life ==
Al-Rimawy is based in Amman, where he is editor-in-chief of the Jordanian newspaper Al Rai.

Al-Rimawy published his debut collection of short stories in 1972. Since then he has published other collections, including a volume of short stories entitled Missed Appointment (Amman, 2002).
