= Mediterranean Historical Review =

- Discipline: Mediterranean history
- Language: English
- Edited by: Naama Cohen-Hanegbi, Zur Shalev

Publication details
- History: 1986-present
- Publisher: Routledge on behalf of the School of History (Tel Aviv University) (Israel)
- Frequency: Biannually

Standard abbreviations
- ISO 4: Mediterr. Hist. Rev.

Indexing
- ISSN: 0951-8967 (print); 1743-940X (web)
- LCCN: sf93093360
- OCLC no.: 14124152

Links
- Journal homepage; Online access; Online archive

Mediterranean Historical Review is a peer-reviewed academic journal established in 1986, covering the ancient, medieval, early modern, and contemporary history of the Mediterranean basin. It is published by Routledge on behalf of the School of History at Tel Aviv University. The editors-in-chief are Naama Cohen-Hanegbi and Zur Shalev.
