= Abwein =

Village in the West Bank, State of Palestine

'Abwein
- Place

Arabic transcription(s)
  - Arabic: عبوين
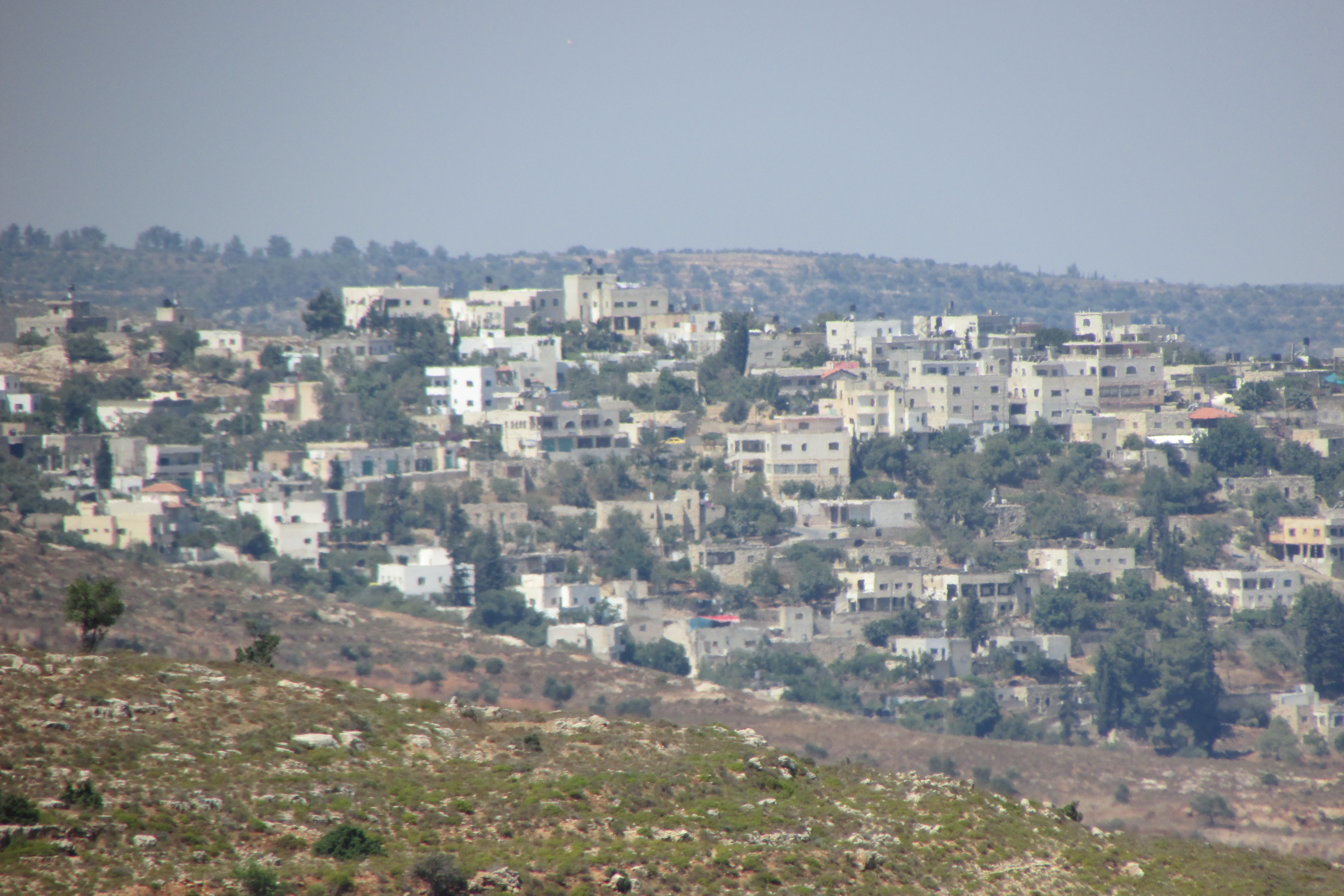
- Abwein from the north

- Location of Abwein
- Coordinates: 32°1′57″N 35°11′57″E
- Palestine grid: 169/160
- State: State of Palestine
- Governorate: Ramallah and al-Bireh

Government
  - Head of Municipality: Fatima Sahweil

Area
  - Total: 16,205 dunams (16.205 km^{2}; 6.257 sq mi)

Population (2017)
  - Total: 3,496
  - Density: 215.7/km^{2} (558.8/sq mi)
- Name meaning: from a personal name
- Website: www.abwain.org

'Abwein (Arabic: عبوين) is a Palestinian village in the Ramallah and al-Bireh Governorate of the State of Palestine, located about 37 kilometers north of Ramallah, in the northern West Bank. According to the Palestinian Central Bureau of Statistics, Abwein's population was 3,496 in 2017.

'Abwein's main agricultural products are olives, figs, grapes, apples, peaches, pears, and vegetables. There are three schools in the town with about 1,200 students and about 200 students are enrolled in various Palestinian universities. Abwein also has three mosques, the largest of which is the Farouk Mosque.

== Location ==
'Abwein is located 14.3 km north of Ramallah. It is bordered by Jilijliya and Sinjil to the east, Ammuriya and Al-Lubban ash-Sharqiya to the north, Bani Zeid ash Sharqiya to the west, and Atara to the south.

== History ==
Pottery sherds from Iron Age II, Persian, Hellenistic, Byzantine, and Crusader/Ayyubid era have been found.

Reinhold Röhricht identified 'Abwein as the Crusader village of Casale Bubil or Casale Bubin.

In the village is an old maqam (holy man's tomb) called ash-Shaykh Ya'qub. According to Moshe Sharon, the tomb has been neglected. The tombstone was in secondary use in a terrace. It had an inscription dating to September 1339 in Mamluk naskhi script dedicated to a Hajji Ya'qub, son of Shaikh Dawud ibn Ahmad, who died that year. It also refers to the Mamluk sultan of that time period, al-Nasir Muhammad. Pottery sherds from the Mamluk era and a hoard of 406 silver coins, mostly from the period of Sultan Baibars, have also been found.

=== Ottoman era ===
The village was incorporated into the Ottoman Empire in 1517 with all of Palestine, and in 1596 it appeared in the Ottoman tax registers as being in the nahiya (subdistrict) of Quds, part of the liwa (district) of Quds. It had a population of 53 households, all Muslims. The villagers paid a fixed tax rate of 33.3% on wheat, barley, olive trees, vineyards, fruit trees, goats and/or beehives; a total of 8,750 akçe. All of the revenue went to a Waqf.

In 1838 it was noted as a Muslim village in the Bani Zeid administrative region. During this time, residents from 'Abwein settled in Sarafand al-Kharab near al-Ramla.

In 1870 Victor Guérin visited the village, which he called "A'youein", and estimated it to have about 300 inhabitants. He described it as having abundant water-sources, beautiful walnut trees, and gardens with figs, olives and pomegranates. An Ottoman village list of about the same year, 1870, showed that 'Abwein had 158 houses and a population of 429, though the population count included men only.

In 1882, the PEF's Survey of Western Palestine described 'Abwein as a village situated on the slope of a hill, with a well to the south, and olive trees on its lower north side.

In 1896 the population of 'Abwain was estimated to be about 933 persons.

=== British Mandate era ===
In the 1922 census of Palestine conducted by the British Mandate authorities, 'Abwein had a population of 543 Muslims, increasing in the 1931 census to 695, still all Muslim, in 171 houses.

In the 1945 statistics the population was 880 Muslims, while the total land area was 16,205 dunams, according to an official land and population survey. Of this, 1,863 were allocated for plantations and irrigable land, 8,296 for cereals, while 36 dunams were classified as built-up areas.

=== Jordanian era ===
In the wake of the 1948 Arab–Israeli War, and after the 1949 Armistice Agreements, 'Abwein came under Jordanian rule.

The Jordanian census of 1961 found 1,174 inhabitants.

=== 1967, aftermath ===
Since the Six-Day War in 1967, 'Abwein has been under Israeli occupation.

After the 1995 accords, 79.8% of village land is defined as Area A land, 9,2% as Area B, and the remainder 11% as Area C.

The Sahweil Castle in 'Abwein was renovated in 1996. In 2005, a 13-member municipality was established by the Palestinian National Authority to administer the town's civil affairs. In the December 2004 Palestinian municipal elections, 28 candidates competed for the mayoral seat and despite strong opposition from religious parties, Fatima Sahweil, a member of Fatah and principal of a local girls' high school, won. The Fatah list won a total of 12 of 'Abwein Municipality's 13 seats.

== Demography ==
Most of 'Abwein's current inhabitants belong to the Sahweil and Mazahim families. According to the 'Abwein Municipal Council, the town's inhabitants are descendants of Abu Ayyub al-Ansari tribe.

== See also ==
- Bani Zeid al-Sharqiya

== Bibliography ==
- Barron, J.B., ed. (1923). Palestine: Report and General Abstracts of the Census of 1922. Government of Palestine.
- Conder, C.R.; Kitchener, H.H. (1882). The Survey of Western Palestine: Memoirs of the Topography, Orography, Hydrography, and Archaeology. Vol. 2. London: Committee of the Palestine Exploration Fund.
- Finkelstein, I.; Lederman, Zvi, eds. (1997). Highlands of many cultures. Tel Aviv: Institute of Archaeology of Tel Aviv University Publications Section. ISBN 965-440-007-3.
- Government of Jordan, Department of Statistics (1964). First Census of Population and Housing. Volume I: Final Tables; General Characteristics of the Population (PDF).
- Government of Palestine, Department of Statistics (1945). Village Statistics, April, 1945.
- Guérin, V. (1875). Description Géographique Historique et Archéologique de la Palestine (in French). Vol. 2: Samarie, pt. 2. Paris: L'Imprimerie Nationale.
- Hadawi, S. (1970). Village Statistics of 1945: A Classification of Land and Area ownership in Palestine. Palestine Liberation Organization Research Centre. Archived from the original on 2018-12-08.
- Hartmann, M. (1883). "Die Ortschaftenliste des Liwa Jerusalem in dem türkischen Staatskalender für Syrien auf das Jahr 1288 der Flucht (1871)". Zeitschrift des Deutschen Palästina-Vereins. 6: 102–149.
- Hütteroth, W.-D.; Abdulfattah, K. (1977). Historical Geography of Palestine, Transjordan and Southern Syria in the Late 16th Century. Erlanger Geographische Arbeiten, Sonderband 5. Erlangen, Germany: Vorstand der Fränkischen Geographischen Gesellschaft. ISBN 3-920405-41-2.
- Irving, Sarah (2012). Palestine. Bradt Travel Guides. ISBN 9781841623672.
- Mayer, L.A. (1934). "A hoard of Mamluk coins". Quarterly of the Department of Antiquities in Palestine. 3: 167–171.
- Mills, E., ed. (1932). Census of Palestine 1931. Population of Villages, Towns and Administrative Areas. Jerusalem: Government of Palestine.
- Palmer, E.H. (1881). The Survey of Western Palestine: Arabic and English Name Lists Collected During the Survey by Lieutenants Conder and Kitchener, R. E. Transliterated and Explained by E.H. Palmer. Committee of the Palestine Exploration Fund.
- Robinson, E.; Smith, E. (1841). Biblical Researches in Palestine, Mount Sinai and Arabia Petraea: A Journal of Travels in the year 1838. Vol. 3. Boston: Crocker & Brewster.
- Röhricht, R. (1887). "Studien zur mittelalterlichen Geographie und Topographie Syriens". Zeitschrift des Deutschen Palästina-Vereins. 10: 195–344.
- Schick, C. (1896). "Zur Einwohnerzahl des Bezirks Jerusalem". Zeitschrift des Deutschen Palästina-Vereins. 19: 120–127.
- Sharon, M. (1997). Corpus Inscriptionum Arabicarum Palaestinae, A. Vol. 1. BRILL. ISBN 90-04-10833-5.
- Socin, A. (1879). "Alphabetisches Verzeichniss von Ortschaften des Paschalik Jerusalem". Zeitschrift des Deutschen Palästina-Vereins. 2: 135–163.
