= Salim Tamari =

Palestinian sociologist

Salim Tamari (Arabic: سليم تماري; born 1945), is a Palestinian-American sociologist who is the director of the Institute of Palestine Studies and an adjunct professor at the Center for Contemporary Arab Studies at Georgetown University. Rashid Khalidi, the Edward Said Professor of Modern Arab Studies at Columbia University, has called Tamari "the preeminent Palestinian historical sociologist."

== Early life and education ==
Tamari was born in Jaffa, British Mandate Palestine, in 1945. When he was three years old, in April 1948, his family fled Jaffa when it was attacked by Jewish paramilitary groups as part of the 1948 Arab–Israeli War. Tamari studied at Birzeit College (later renamed Birzeit University) in the West Bank and then received a B.A. in politics from Drew University in New Jersey, United States. He later received an M.A. in sociology from the University of New Hampshire and a Ph.D. in sociology from the University of Manchester.

== Career ==
Tamari has been a sociologist at Birzeit University since 1971. In 1994, he was appointed director of the Institute of Jerusalem Studies, an affiliate of the Beirut-based Institute for Palestine Studies that publishes the Arabic journal Jerusalem Quarterly (formerly Jerusalem Quarterly File). He has also served on the refugee committee in the multilateral peace talks held following the Madrid Conference of 1991. He has been a visiting fellow at the Aga Khan Program for Islamic Architecture at MIT, and has been a visiting professor at the University of California Berkeley (2005, 2007), New York University (2001–03); Cornell University (1997), and the University of Chicago (1991–92). He was a 2008 Eric Lane Fellow at the University of Cambridge and is a lecturer in Mediterranean Studies at the Ca' Foscari University of Venice.

== Works ==
Drawing upon archival materials and personal diaries, Tamari has produced numerous studies documenting and analysing Palestinian society. Books by Tamari include:

- Jerusalem 1948: The Arab Neighborhoods and Their Fate in the War
- Palestinian Refugee Negotiations: From Madrid to Oslo II
- Mountain against the Sea: Essays on Palestinian Society and Culture
- Year of the Locust: A Soldier's Diary and the Erasure of Palestine's Ottoman Past, a biography of a young Palestinian soldier stationed in Jerusalem during World War I and referred to on worldcat.org as "the first ordinary recruit to describe the World War I from the Arab side". Berkeley: University of California Press, 2011.
