= Ehud R. Toledano =

Israeli historian

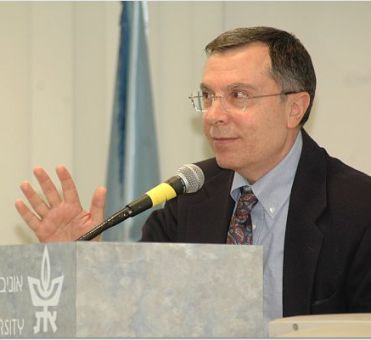
Ehud R. Toledano

Ehud R. Toledano (Hebrew: אהוד טולידאנו; born 1949) is an Israeli historian of the Ottoman Empire and the modern Middle East. He is professor emeritus of Middle Eastern history at Tel Aviv University, where he held the University Chair for Ottoman and Turkish Studies and co-directed the Program in Ottoman and Turkish Studies. He is known primarily for his work on slavery and the slave trade in the Ottoman Middle East and for his research on Ottoman–Arab socio-political and socio-cultural history, including his thesis that Ottoman and local elites in the Arab provinces merged into "Ottoman-local" elites.

== Education ==
Toledano completed a BA at the Hebrew University of Jerusalem in 1974 and a PhD at Princeton University in 1979, after master's degrees at the University of Michigan (1975) and Princeton (1977).

== Family ==
Toledano's uncle, Shmuel Toledano, was a senior Mossad official, served as adviser on Arab affairs to Prime Ministers Levi Eshkol and Golda Meir and for most of Yitzhak Rabin's first term, and was a member of the ninth Knesset. Ehud Toledano's great-uncle was Rabbi Jacob Moses Toledano, who was elected Sephardi chief rabbi of Tel Aviv in 1942 and appointed by David Ben-Gurion as Minister of Religious Affairs in 1958.

== Academic career ==
Toledano was a postdoctoral fellow at the American Research Center in Egypt in Cairo (1979–81), a senior fellow at St Antony's College, Oxford (1986–87), a senior research fellow at the University of Pennsylvania (1993–94) and a visiting professor at the University of California, Los Angeles (1999–2001). He also held a research fellowship at the American Research Institute in Turkey in Istanbul (1977–78).

At Tel Aviv University he directed the Graduate School of History (2004–2008) and was a member of the university's Board of Directors (2005–2009), representing the University Senate. He was founding co-director, with Eyal Zisser, of the Executive MA Program in Contemporary Middle Eastern Studies (2004–2010), held the University Chair for Ottoman and Turkish Studies from 2007 to 2013, and co-directed the Program in Ottoman and Turkish Studies from 2013 to 2023.

He was a member of the peer-review panel for The Study of the Human Past (SH6) for the European Research Council's Advanced Grants in the 2020 and 2022 calls. He was a member of the editorial panel of the journal Mediterranean Historical Review and is a member of the advisory board of the Journal of Global Slavery.

== Public role ==
In 1997 Toledano was nominated as Israel's ambassador to Turkey, but Turkey objected to the nomination because of statements he had made about the Armenian genocide. After a public controversy, the Israeli government withdrew the nomination and he did not take up the post.

== Research ==
Toledano's research on slavery in the Ottoman Middle East includes The Ottoman Slave Trade and Its Suppression, 1840–1890 (1982), Slavery and Abolition in the Ottoman Middle East (1998) and As If Silent and Absent (2007). The last book examines enslavement from the point of view of the enslaved rather than through a master–slave domination framework. In the Journal of Interdisciplinary History, John O. Voll described it as a significant addition to the literature on slavery and on Ottoman history.

In a 1997 chapter, Toledano proposed that Ottoman officials in the Arab provinces were being localized while local Arabic-speaking elites were being Ottomanized, producing "Ottoman-local" elites. The historian Tal Shuval discussed the thesis in 1998, finding it consistent with developments in most Arabic-speaking provinces but arguing that Ottoman Algiers did not fit it. In a 2025 article, Toledano argued that Albert Hourani's "notables paradigm", which long dominated writing on the late Ottoman Arab world, took some two decades to be revised and was eventually displaced by an Ottomanist account built on Ottoman-local elites.

== Reception ==
Reviewing Slavery and Abolition in the Ottoman Middle East in 1999, Karen Barkey called Toledano a renowned scholar of the Ottoman slave trade and of state–society relations in Egypt. A review of As If Silent and Absent on H-Net described him as a pioneer in the study of slavery in the Ottoman Empire and the Muslim world.

His books have been widely reviewed. The Ottoman Slave Trade and Its Suppression was reviewed in the Journal of Interdisciplinary History and the Journal of the American Oriental Society. State and Society in Mid-Nineteenth-Century Egypt was reviewed in the Journal of Interdisciplinary History and the International Journal of Middle East Studies. Slavery and Abolition in the Ottoman Middle East was reviewed in the Middle East Journal and the International Journal of Middle East Studies. As If Silent and Absent was reviewed in Middle Eastern Studies.

== Selected works ==
=== Books ===
- The Ottoman Slave Trade and Its Suppression, 1840–1890. Princeton: Princeton University Press, 1982. ISBN 978-0-691-05369-1.
- State and Society in Mid-Nineteenth-Century Egypt. Cambridge: Cambridge University Press, 1990. ISBN 978-0-521-37194-0.
- Slavery and Abolition in the Ottoman Middle East. Seattle: University of Washington Press, 1998. ISBN 978-0-295-97642-6.
- As If Silent and Absent: Bonds of Enslavement in the Islamic Middle East. New Haven: Yale University Press, 2007. ISBN 978-0-300-11461-4.
- Ottoman and Islamic Enslavement from a Global Perspective: Theory, Methodology, Practice. Berlin: EB-Verlag, 2020.

=== Edited volumes ===
- With Israel Gershoni (eds.), Cultural Processes in Muslim and Arab Societies, Poetics Today 14/2, 14/3 and 15/2 (1993–94).
- (ed.), African Communities in Asia and the Mediterranean: Identities between Integration and Conflict. Halle: Max Planck Institute; Trenton: Africa World Press, 2011.
- With Dror Ze'evi (eds.), Society, Law, and Culture in the Middle East: "Modernities" in the Making. Berlin: De Gruyter, 2015.
- With Stephan Conermann, Youval Rotman and Rachel Zelnick-Abramovitz (eds.), Comparative and Global Framing of Enslavement. Berlin: De Gruyter, 2023.

=== Selected articles and chapters ===
- "The Emergence of Ottoman-Local Elites (1700–1800): A Framework for Research." In I. Pappé and M. Ma'oz (eds.), Middle Eastern Politics and Ideas: A History from Within. London: Tauris, 1997, 145–162.
- "Enslavement in the Ottoman Empire in the Early Modern Period." In The Cambridge World History of Slavery, vol. 3. Cambridge University Press, 2011, 25–46.
- "The Arabic-Speaking World in the Ottoman Period: A Socio-Political Analysis." In Christine Woodhead (ed.), The Ottoman World. London: Routledge, 2011, 453–466.
- "Shifting Patterns of Ottoman Enslavement." In Eyal Ginio and Elie Podeh (eds.), The Ottoman Middle East: Studies in Honor of Amnon Cohen. Leiden: Brill, 2014, 201–220.
- "The Fusion of Zar-Bori and Sufi Zikr as Performance: Enslaved Africans in the Ottoman Empire." In A. Öztürkmen and E. B. Vitz (eds.), Medieval and Early Modern Performance in the Eastern Mediterranean. Turnhout: Brepols, 2014, 216–240.
- "Muhammad Farid: Between Nationalism and the Egyptian-Ottoman Diaspora." In Anthony Gorman and Sossie Kasbarian (eds.), Diasporas of the Modern Middle East: Contextualising Community. Edinburgh University Press, 2015, 70–102.
- With Michael Ferguson, "Ottoman Slavery and Abolition in the Nineteenth Century." In The Cambridge World History of Slavery, vol. 4. Cambridge University Press, 2016, 197–225.
- "Enslavement and Freedom in Transition: MENA Societies from Empires to National States." Journal of Global Slavery 2 (2017): 100–121.
- "Ottoman Elite Enslavement and 'Social Death'." In John Bodel and Walter Scheidel (eds.), After "Slavery and Social Death". Oxford: Blackwell, 2017, 136–150.
- "Ottoman and Islamic Societies: Were They 'Slave Societies'?" In N. Lenski and C. M. Cameron (eds.), What Is a Slave Society? Cambridge University Press, 2018, 360–382.
- "The Rise and Fall of the Notables Paradigm? Why It Has Taken So Long." The Journal of the Middle East and Africa (2025): 1–27.
