= Killing of Mustafa Tamimi =

Killing of unarmed Palestinian taxi driver by Israeli security forces

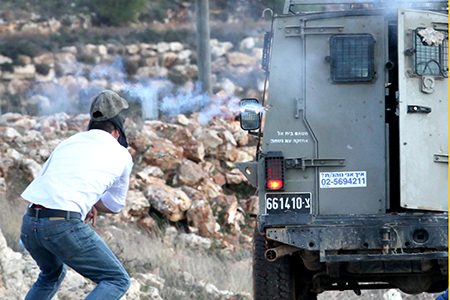
- Mustafa Tamimi moments before being hit by a tear gas canister
- Date: 9 December 2011 (incident) 10 December 2011 (Tamimi's death)
- Location: Nabi Salih, West Bank, Palestine
- Type: Death in a protest
- Cause: Gas canister shot at close range
- Participants: Palestinian protesters, IDF soldiers
- Outcome: Death of Mustafa Tamimi 10 December 2011, protests
- Burial: 11 December 2011
- Inquiries: IDF
- Accused: IDF soldier
- Verdict: According to Israeli army, the soldier firing the canister "did not see any people in the line of fire" and was not criminally liable.

Mustafa Tamimi, a 28-year-old Palestinian taxi driver, was killed when he was hit by a tear gas canister by Israeli forces fired from close range and striking him directly in the face on 9 December 2011 during a weekly protest in Nabi Salih, West Bank. The tear gas canister that struck him was fired from the rear door of a military vehicle at which he was throwing stones while running after it. The incident raised questions about Israeli military behavior when engaging with the demonstrators.

Some Israeli military officials used social media to defend the army. Israeli army statements said that Tamimi was throwing a rock when he was targeted and that the soldier firing the canister "did not see any people in the line of fire" and was not criminally liable. Tamimi's brother, Louai, rejected the investigation saying he was not approached by the investigators although he said he witnessed the incident as he was standing close to the army jeep at the time of the shot.

== Background ==
Residents of Nabi Saleh had protested against the Halamish settlement since 1976 when it was first built. Demonstrations were stepped up in 2009 when the settlers claimed a fresh-water spring historically used by the village. The protests were regularly disbanded by Israeli troops using tear gas, and were often accompanied by stone-throwing by local youths. Sarit Michaeli, a spokeswoman for the Israeli human rights group B'Tselem, who was in Nabi Saleh, said she was aware of dozens of cases where, "in violation of explicit regulations", tear gas canisters were fired directly at protesters by Israeli soldiers and border policemen.

== Event ==
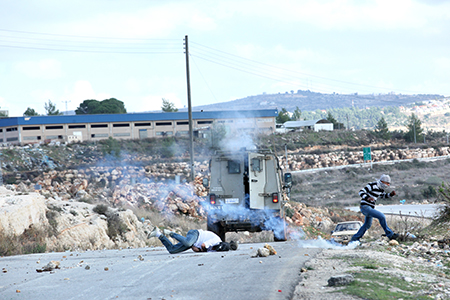
Tamimi on the ground after being hit by the shot

During one of the weekly demonstrations to protest the seizure of Nabi Saleh land by a neighboring Israeli settlement, Tamimi was hit in the head below his right eye by a tear-gas canister fired at close range from the rear door of an Israeli armored vehicle, while he was throwing stones at it. The projectile fired towards Tamimi can be seen in a photograph of the incident. According to the Israeli activist Haim Schwarczenberg, Tamimi fell down after he was hit, and his friends then rushed to him and "covered his bloodied face with a black-and-white Palestinian checkered scarf". He was taken to Beilinson Hospital in central Israel where he died from his wounds the next day.

== Aftermath ==
=== Funeral ===
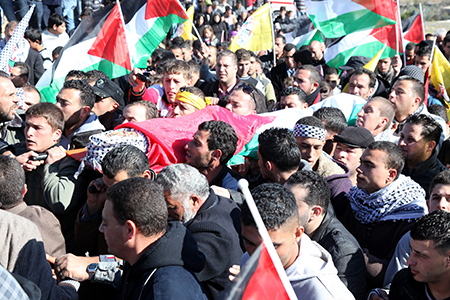
Tamimi's funeral

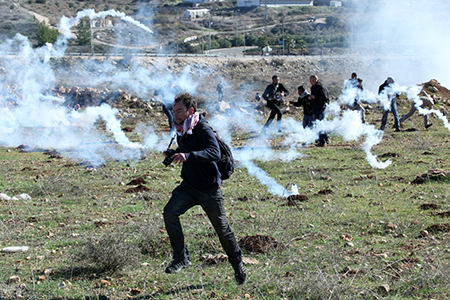
Violence at Tamimi's funeral

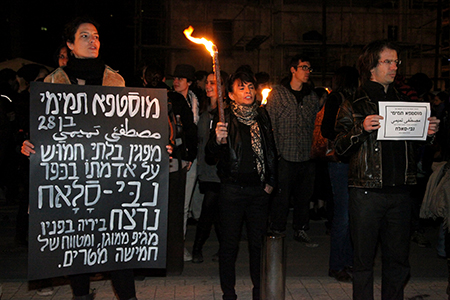
Israelis gather in Tel Aviv to protest Tamimi's killing

Thousands of Palestinians participated in Tamimi's funeral where his body, wrapped in a Palestinian flag, was moved from the hospital in Ramallah ten kilometres (6.2 mi) north to Nabi Saleh in West Bank. Participants held up posters showing graphic images of Tamimi's injuries. These were also "plastered on monuments in Ramallah's central squares". The mourning event turned violent. Israeli soldiers fired tear gas canisters in response to stones being thrown and tried to push the protesters back using "jets of skunk water, a foul-smelling chemical waste spray". Four Israelis and two foreign activists were arrested. Six people, including Israeli activist Jonathan Pollack, were injured at the funeral.

=== Investigations ===
The Israeli army said it was investigating the incident. In its initial statement, Israeli military said that Tamimi "threw rocks at IDF soldiers". Later investigation said that the soldier "did not see any people in the line of fire" and was not criminally liable. According to the IDF the soldier could not clearly see Tamimi and did not "aim" to shoot the gas canister at him. The Israeli human rights group B'Tselem questioned the legality of the soldier's act since he "could not ensure that no harm will result". IDF also said that they could not reconstruct the event because there were rocks thrown at the investigators. Tamimi's brother, Louai, rejected the investigation saying that investigators had not approached him although he was a witness to the incident standing about four to five metres (thirteen to sixteen feet) from the army jeep when the soldier shot. Speaking to the Reuters he said: "there is no doubt that he saw us, and struck my brother directly".

The IDF speaker said a Palestinian witness refused to testify. Tamimi running towards the Jeep, the tear-gas launcher appearing from the rear door, the canister in the air, and then "Tamimi falling to the ground, clutching his face", are seen in photographs taken of the incident. According to B'Tselem the fact it took two years for the military to come to a decision, though the incident was "well-documented", indicated "the failure of the military investigation system." B'Tselem also said that the decision announced by the military was not in accordance with its regulations over the use of tear gas.

=== Controversies ===
Tamimi's supporters accused Israeli soldiers "of using excessive force to deal with the protester, delaying an ambulance from reaching him and not letting his family or others to be with him". Tamimi's death, and the photo which was said to record the moment before he was hit, raised concerns over the Israeli military's use of force in dealing with Palestinian demonstrators. Human-rights groups questioned whether the forces respect military rules of engagement for demonstrators. The "widely publicized" photograph gave the impression that the Israeli soldier had deliberately targeted Tamimi.

The Telegraph described Israeli military officials as "largely unapologetic for the death", and trying to prove Tamimi had thrown stones by "releasing pictures of a sling they said was found on Tamimi's body". Some of the military officials "defended the army and attacked Tamimi" via Twitter, among them Peter Lerner, then spokesman for the IDF Central Command, whose Twitter comment caused the most "outrage", according to The Telegraph, and a "storm", according to Yedioth Ahronoth. "What was Mustafa thinking running after a moving jeep while throwing stones #fail", posted Lerner. ("Fail" is an American slang term used in a derogatory manner to denote "extreme stupidity".) Yedioth Ahronoth wrote that Lerner intended "to use the word in its literal sense–as failure", and that he had shown his "happiness" for Tamimi's chance of survival after he was transferred to the hospital. Lerner later denied the mockery and said he did not mean "to hurt anyone's feelings by writing 'fail'", and that "fail" was directed at activists who he believed were not impartial relating the incident. Lerner described the death as an "individual tragedy, with an awful outcome" and believed that Tamimi had "put himself at unnecessary risk" and that the soldier "had operated within the realm of their responsibility".

== See also ==
- Death of Mohammad Habali
- Shooting of Eyad al-Hallaq
