= Fauda (anarchist group) =

Anarchist group in Palestine

Fauda فوضى
- Leader: None (leaderless movement)
- Spokesperson: Abu al Roba
- Founded: 2020
- Membership: c.130
- Ideology: Insurrectionary anarchism

Fauda (also known as FAUDA and the Fauda Movement for Palestine) is an anarchist organisation active in the Palestinian territories. The group was formed in the West Bank in 2020, and has been described as Palestine's first and largest anarchist organisation.

== History ==
=== Formation ===
Members of Fauda have described how anarchism has remained a relatively unknown political philosophy within the Palestinian territories, and that anarchist ideas only began to gain traction after several Palestinian students were introduced to anarchism while studying abroad in the United States and in Britain.

Furthermore, the activities of American anarchists during the 2020 George Floyd protests inspired these Palestinian students to form an anarchist organisation of their own. This organisation would be named Fauda (Arabic: فوضى), which translates to 'anarchy'.

Fauda has members from Muslim, Christian, and Jewish backgrounds.

=== Allegations of non-existence ===
The Russian anarchist website avtonom.org questioned the existence of Fauda, due to the lack of images of the group's activities available. The website suggested that Fauda may actually be a fake organisation created by people outside of Palestine, or even by the Israeli intelligence services, in order to monitor Western and Russian leftists who contact them.

This allegation was refuted by an anarchist Instagram page named @abolishtheusa, which shared images of Fauda members putting up posters in the Palestinian territories, and distributing food in front of the Dome of the Rock in the Al-Aqsa Mosque compound. Furthermore, the Israel anarchist organisation 'anarchyin48' have affirmed the existence of Fauda, stating that some anti-Zionist Jews are members of Fauda.

=== Fundraising controversy ===
In November 2023, the Yale University student-organised dance company 'Ballet Folklórico Mexicano de Yale' put on two performances where the group projected an on-stage QR code which would direct audience members to an Instagram post by @desolasol.colectiva. The Instagram post included a Venmo link to raise money for Fauda. Following criticism, the four co-presidents of 'Ballet Folklórico Mexicano de Yale' later apologised for sharing the QR code.

== Activities ==
Fauda is composed of four units, with each unit being dedicated to a specific activity.

- Education unit, which educates Palestinians about anarchist theory and tactics.
- Executive unit, which organises vigils and protests. Several protests have been held in front of Israeli courts and police stations in the West Bank.
- News unit, which provides updates on the Israeli-Palestinian conflict.
- Media unit, which shares information about Palestine's history, to challenge the narrative presented in the Israeli media.

In the West Bank, members of Fauda have been known to visit the family members of imprisoned Palestinians, and to distribute food and water for iftar and suhur.

== Political position ==
=== The future of Palestine ===
While Fauda advocates for the abolition of all states, the group has acknowledged that a one-state solution is the most realistic option in the current circumstances. Fauda has suggested that following the establishment of one state between the River Jordan and the Mediterranean, the group will advocate for a transition to a stateless society.

Fauda is critical of workers' states, claiming:

Focusing excessively on laws and the management of society by the state will lead to excessive accumulation of power, as we have seen in many Marxist movements, and this will increase the possibilities of corruption and tyranny.

Fauda has stated that it rejects Mahmoud Abbas and the Palestinian Authority.

=== Relationship with other Palestinian groups ===
Fauda advocates for unity among all Palestinian groups in the fight against Zionism, despite ideological differences. Fauda has described Hamas as a 'purely Islamic group', in comparison to Fauda's multi-faith composition, but has stated that the two groups have the same goal, namely, to fight Zionism.

== See also ==
- Anarchism in Israel
- Anarchism in the Middle East
