= Janna Jihad =

Palestinian youth activist and amateur journalist (born 2006)

Janna Tamimi
- جنى تميمي
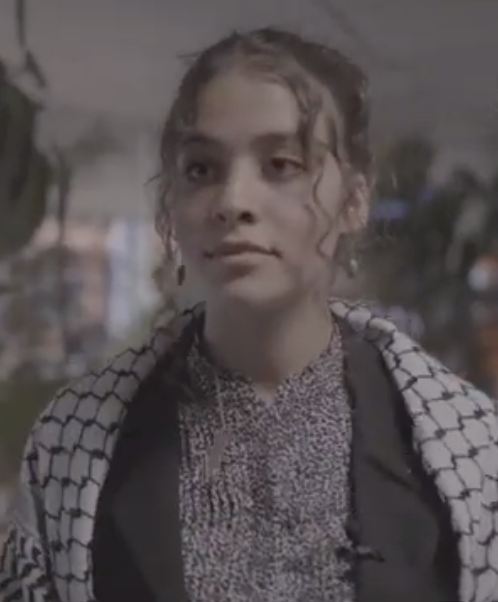
- In a UNOHCHR video in 2023
- Born: 6 April 2006 (age 20); Nabi Salih, Palestine

Janna Jihad Ayyad Al-Tamimi (Arabic: جنى جهاد عياد التميمي; born 6 April 2006), also just Janna Tamimi, is a Palestinian youth activist and amateur journalist who blogs on Facebook and Twitter under the name or handle of "Janna Jihad".

== Biography ==
Tamimi is from Nabi Salih, a village on the West Bank in Palestine. Her mother, Nawal Tamimi, is the director of Women's Affairs in the Palestinian Ministry of Development. She is the niece of activist Bassem al-Tamimi and cousin of activist Ahed Tamimi.

She began reporting on the Israeli–Palestinian conflict when she was seven years old after two of her family members were killed, inspired to document the conflict in a way that media outlets and news corporations had not. She has been called "The Youngest Journalist in Palestine" and is referred to as one of the youngest journalists in the world. Tamimi, who believes she is living in the Third Intifada, supports Palestinian resistance. She began reporting to present the perspective of Palestinian youth growing up amid violence, originally using her mother's iPhone to capture videos of protests near her home and uploading them to Facebook, Instagram, Snapchat, and YouTube. Eventually she began covering events and marches in Jerusalem and Jordan. She reports in Arabic and in English. She has over 270,000 followers on Facebook.

In 2017, Tamimi, hosted by the Ahmed Kathrada Foundation, went to South Africa to spread awareness about the violence in Palestinian territories as part of the Pals4Peace tour with the Shamsaan Children of Palestine. In March 2017, Tamimi was awarded an International Benevolence Award in Istanbul, Turkey. She was featured in the documentary Radiance of Resistance when she was nine years old. She has been praised as a groundbreaking journalist ahead of her time and criticized by some, such as Petra Marquardt-Bigman, as being a propaganda pawn.

In 2023, asked about the "two-state solution" by BBC, she answered: "[it is] very clichéd 'two-state solution' – Western-made, without looking at the real situation," adding: "But where are the borders?"
