= Killing of Mohammad Habali =

Killing of Palestinian man by Israeli soldier

- Date: 4 December 2018
- Time: 2:25am
- Location: Tulkarm, Israeli-occupied West Bank, Palestine
- Also known as: Mohammad Hossam Abdel Latif Habali
- Cause: Live ammunition or rubber-coated shot from back of the head
- Outcome: Death of Mohammad Habali
- Burial: 5 December 2018
- Accused: Israeli soldier

Mohammad Hossam Abdel Latif Habali (Arabic: محمد حسام عبد اللطيف حبالي) was a 22-year-old mentally disabled Palestinian man who was shot and killed by Israeli soldiers on 4 December 2018 in Tulkarm, a city in the Israeli-occupied West Bank, near the 1967 boundary between Israel and the West Bank. Witnesses report that Habali was killed by Israel Defense Forces, and the IDF has not disputed the cause of death.

The Israeli army initially reported that there had been violent confrontations in which soldiers responded to rock throwing with live fire. B'tselem later released footage showing that Habali had been shot in the back of the head on a quiet street by Israeli forces who are then seen leaving the area without providing any medical assistance. Habali was later transported to a hospital in Tulkarem where he was declared dead. After the release of the video the IDF reported that it had opened an investigation in to the death. An investigation into Habali's death by the IDF has remained open in its initial stages as of July 2019.

== Background ==
Wide range arrest campaigns are frequently carried out by the Israeli army across the occupied West Bank under the pretense of searching for the "wanted" Palestinians, which the Palestinian authorities say are violation of agreements Israel has signed up under the Oslo II Accord. Hadashot news reported that IDF arrested 1,380 Palestinian suspects in 2017 in similar missions. Israeli forces military operations in the West Bank were stepped up lately. Israeli forces arrested 24 Palestinians in overnight raids carried out on Tuesday, 4 December 2018, according to a Palestinian NGO.

== Event ==
On 4 December 2018, at about midnight, 100 Israeli soldiers entered Tulkarem to raid various Palestinian homes. About 30 of the soldiers spread out in small teams across a-Nuzha Street and an alley near al-Fadiliyah Boys' High School. This was followed by the residents coming out of their homes and standing about 150 meters away from the soldiers near a local restaurant, to see what was going on. A video obtained from the security-camera of a local restaurant in Tulkarem shows that at 2:25am, three soldiers moved towards the restaurant, stopping 80 metres away, and opened fire at the people to disperse them. Mohammad Habali, one of the bystanders, walks away from the confrontation "holding a stick when he is shot from behind and falls down on his face."

The video shows Habali at the entrance to a restaurant standing with a group of friends before the shooting. Contrary to what the Israeli military said, the video showed that there was no violence or clashes between Palestinians and the Israeli army when Habali was shot, and that the shooting was unlawful and unjustified. Another video of the scene captured by a smartphone, according to i24NEWS, seemed to contradict with a declaration by an IDF military spokesperson saying IDF were confronted with "a violent riot in which dozens of Palestinians hurled rocks."

According to the Palestinian news agency WAFA, Habali had been shot twice, once in the lower limbs and once in the head, although there were conflicting claims over whether the used bullets were rubber-coated or live ammunition. Rubber-coated bullets, otherwise known as rubber bullets, can kill if they hit vital organs. He was taken to Thabet Thabet Hospital in Tulkarem, where he died from his gunshot wounds.

"Habali's brother, Alaa, said Mohammed had suffered from a mental disability and was also physically disabled after breaking his pelvis in a car accident a few years ago. He said the stick his brother carried was used to help him walk. He said Mohammed had worked in a coffee shop and was in the street after closing the restaurant when he saw soldiers in the area."

== Aftermath ==
=== Funeral ===
Hundreds, among them Palestinian government representatives, participated in Habali's funeral. Governor of Tulkarem gave the condolences of President Mahmoud Abbas to the family of Habali.

=== Investigation ===
On 9 December 2018, after the video obtained from the security-camera of a local restaurant was revealed, The Israeli military said it had opened an investigation into the death of Mohammad Habali. The case was referred to the IDF’s Military Police Criminal Investigation Division. According to the Associated Press, Habali's case is among the 24 investigations opened on "potentially criminal shootings of Palestinians in the occupied West Bank" and had not been progressed after 7 months in July 2019. No key witness is interviewed by the Israeli authorities.

The Israel military has verified that its forces had opened fire and did not, as of 22 July 2019, dispute the cause of his death. According to the NGO B'tselem, "the lethal shooting was not preceded by a warning, was not justified, and constitutes a violation of the law".

== See also ==
- Killing of Mustafa Tamimi
- Killing of Eyad al-Hallaq
