= Anarchism in Israel =

Political advocacy for the abolition of state and hierarchy amongst Israelis

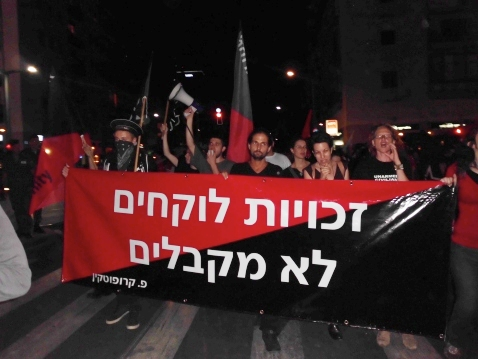
Anarchists protesting in Tel Aviv in 2012

Anarchism in Israel has a history predating the State of Israel, having been observed in the early Kibbutz movement, among early Labor Zionists, as well as an organised movement in response to the establishment of a state following the 1948 Palestine war. Over time, the history of Israeli Anarchism has had a mixed and diachronically shifting relationship with Zionism and the Israeli–Palestinian conflict, with +972 Magazine publishing an article claiming anarchists were "the only group in Israel engaged in serious anti-occupation activism." Animal rights are notably popular among Israeli anarchists, even when compared to anarchist movements in other countries.

Uri Gordon estimated that there were up to 300 politically active anarchists in Israel circa 2007.

== Anarchism and Zionism ==
Numerous political movements, including Anarchism, Marxism, Zionism, and Bundist Anti-Zionism were popular among many secular European Jewish communities in the early 20th century in response to the heavy antisemitism present in Europe and the Haskalah or Jewish Enlightenment of the previous century.

Anarchist ideas circulated during early Jewish immigration to Palestine and were influential in the development of the Kibbutzim. The first 28 Kibbutzim were founded between 1910 and 1914 in a context of strikes and labor disputes. According to Uri Gordon, the initial founders of the Kibbutzim aimed to "create a free socialist society of Jews and Arabs in Palestine." Gustav Landauer was influential on some Kibbutzim activists.

The Hapoel Hatzair (English: The Young Worker) party produced papers discussing Proudhon and Kropotkin. The party's spiritual leader Aharon David Gordon was influenced by Hasidic mysticism, Friedrich Nietzsche and Tolstoy. He did not advocate for a Jewish state and called for cooperation with local Arab peasants. Many leftist Zionists rejected the idea of establishing a Jewish nation-state and promoted Jewish-Arab cooperation.

The Russian-born Zionist Joseph Trumpeldor declared himself an anarcho-communist and Zionist. He helped organise early Jewish self-defence forces and aimed to construct a "General Commune in Palestine". In the late 1920s, anarchist influence among Jewish immigrants began to decrease.

== In the early State of Israel (1940s–1980s) ==
The establishment of the State of Israel was received with mixed feelings by many Jewish anarchists. The Holocaust exterminated roughly half of the world's Jewish population and had pushed many into supporting a Jewish state for protection from antisemitism. Many anarchists at the time also hoped Israel could move towards being an anarchist society. The wife of David Ben-Gurion, Paula Ben-Gurion, was an anarchist.

In the early 1950s, Noam Chomsky and his wife Carol Chomsky backpacked around Israel, briefly living on a Kibbutz.

Abba Gordin immigrated to Israel from the United States in 1958 and established the anarchist group ASHUACH (Agudat Shocharei Chofesh, Freedom-Seekers Association) that had around 150 members. The group published the monthly review Problemot in Hebrew and Yiddish and had a library in Tel Aviv of anarchist texts in Hebrew, Yiddish and Polish. Gordin was in contact with Jewish anarchist groups in New York City (Freie Arbeiter Shtime) and Buenos Aires. Supposedly during this period, there was some attempt by Shin Bet to monitor them. The anarchists of this period have been criticised for being too insular and not connecting with Israeli social struggles.

Following the 1967 Six Day War, anarchists were cooperative with the Socialist Organization of Israel who published the anti-Zionist Matzpen, as well as working with the Israeli Black Panthers. Anarchists protested the 1982 Lebanon war and Toma Sik helped found the Israeli chapter of War Resisters' International.

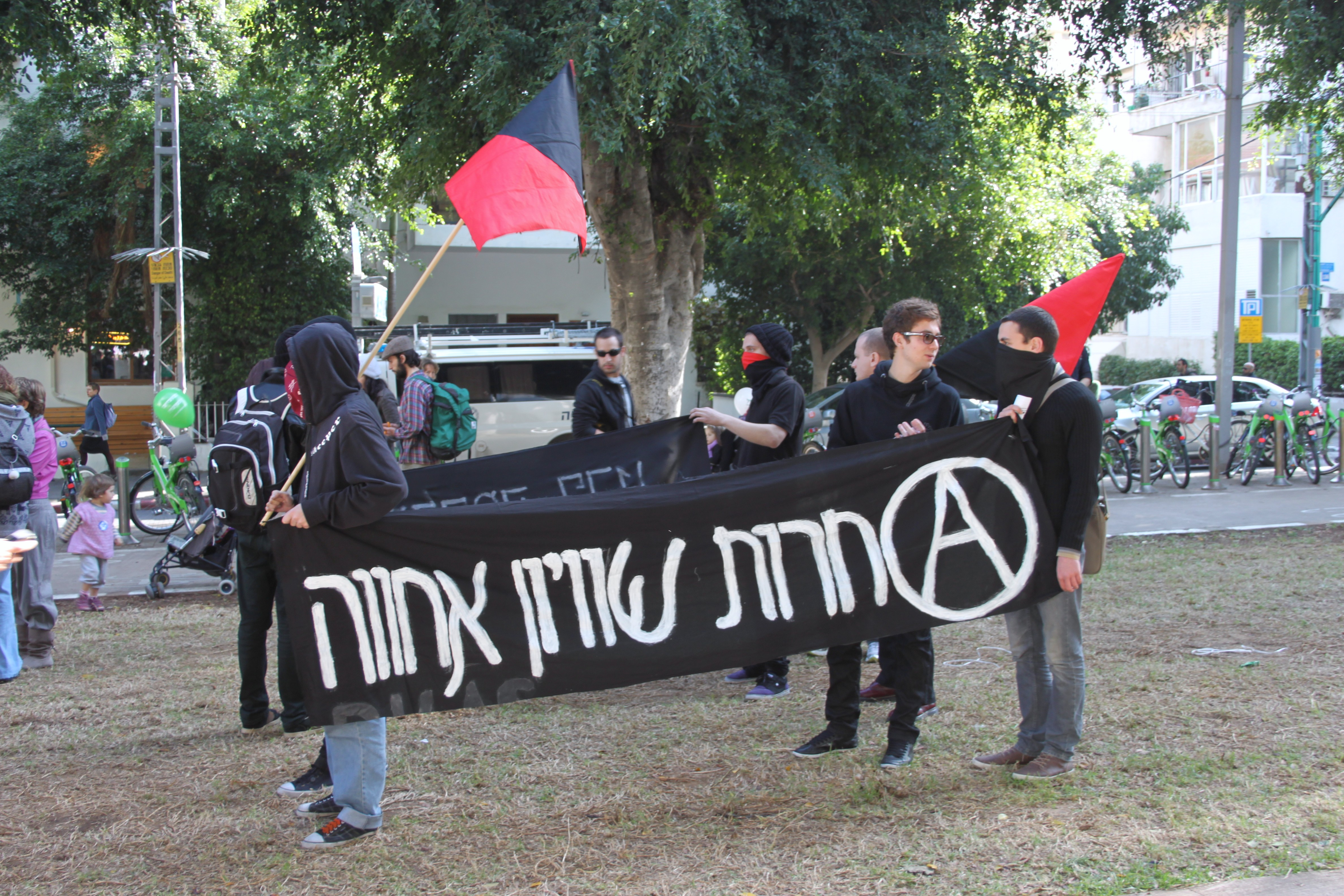
Anarchists in Israel with banner reading "Liberty, egalitarianism, fraternity" (based on "Liberté, égalité, fraternité")

== Contemporary Israeli anarchism (1980s-today) ==
Anarchism was active in the late 1980s as part of the Israeli punk movement as well as among conscientious objectors during the First Intifada. A small anarchist group was established in Haifa, with Juliano Mer-Khamis being one of 3 members. This has been described as a period of optimism for the Israeli left due to the Oslo accords, which lasted until 1995 with the assassination of Yitzhak Rabin by Israeli right-wing extremist Yigal Amir.

The short-lived Israeli Anarchist Federation protested against police brutality and Israel's first McDonald's. Anarchism grew in the late 1990s as part of environmental protests against Highway 6. Inspired by the 1999 Seattle WTO protests, anarchists began organising Food Not Bombs and Reclaim the Streets parties, as well as establishing the Salon Mazal infoshop in Tel Aviv and the Israeli Indymedia. There was tension between the older generation of anarchists and the younger generation during this period, as the older generation tended to be more supportive of the IDF out of historical trauma.

Anarchists became involved in the Israeli animal rights movement in the 1990s, helping organise Anonymous for Animal Rights (described as the Israeli equivalent of PETA) in its early stages. During the Second Intifada, there was a new wave of organising around Palestinian solidarity. Many international anarchists arrived alongside the International Solidarity Movement (ISM) to accompany Palestinian actions against roadblocks and curfews. ISM activists Rachel Corrie and Tom Hurndall were killed by the IDF in Gaza, with a campaign of political repression featuring police raids, deportations and denial of entry to ISM activists.

In 2002, anarchists founded the vegan anarchist affinity group Ma'avak Ehad (One Struggle). In 2003, One Struggle activists working with Palestinians in dismantling a barrier in Mas’ha in the West Bank chose the name Anarchists Against the Wall (AAtW) in a media statement. In December of the same year and again in Mas'ha activist and former paratrooper Gil Na'amati was shot and wounded in both legs by the IDF during AAtW-involved protests against the wall. AAtW have since been credited with leading the Israeli opposition to the 2006 Lebanon War.

Uri Gordon, Anarchist writer and long time activist, has written in 2007 that anarchists are often accused of being fifth columns that benefit Iran and Al-Qaeda.

Anarchists participated in the 2011 Israeli social justice protests, which have been seen as the Israeli wing of the Occupy movement and have been noted for attempting to link the struggle to the Israeli–Palestinian conflict.

In the 2010s, the anarcho-communist group Ahdut was formed, started by Israeli anarchists of Russian descent, which later disbanded. In 2019, Israeli anarchist Jonathan Pollak was physically assaulted by two men who waited outside of his workplace and slashed him across the face with a knife. Pollak would not report the attack to the police.

=== 2020s ===
During the COVID-19 pandemic, an anarchist collective in Haifa organised mutual aid projects and food distributions during the lockdowns. In 2020 anti-Zionist Jews joined the Palestinian anarchist group Fauda, which co-operates with Israeli anarchists. During the 2023 Israeli judicial reform protests, Benjamin Netanyahu called the protesters "traitors" and "anarchists". Israeli anarchist Ilan Shalif has claimed at least 20 anarchists attended the protests. Anarchists have attended anti-war protests inside Israel during the Gaza war.

== See also ==
- Category:Israeli anarchists
- List of anarchist movements by region
- Anarchism in Egypt
- Anarchism in Syria
- Black Laundry
- Moshav
- Anti-Occupation Bloc
- Ta'ayush

== Bibliography ==
- Nedava, Joseph (January 1974). "Abba Gordin: A portrait of a Jewish anarchist". Soviet Jewish Affairs. 4 (2): 73–79. doi:10.1080/13501677408577196.
