= Ahed Tamimi =

Palestinian activist (born 2001)

- عهد التميمي
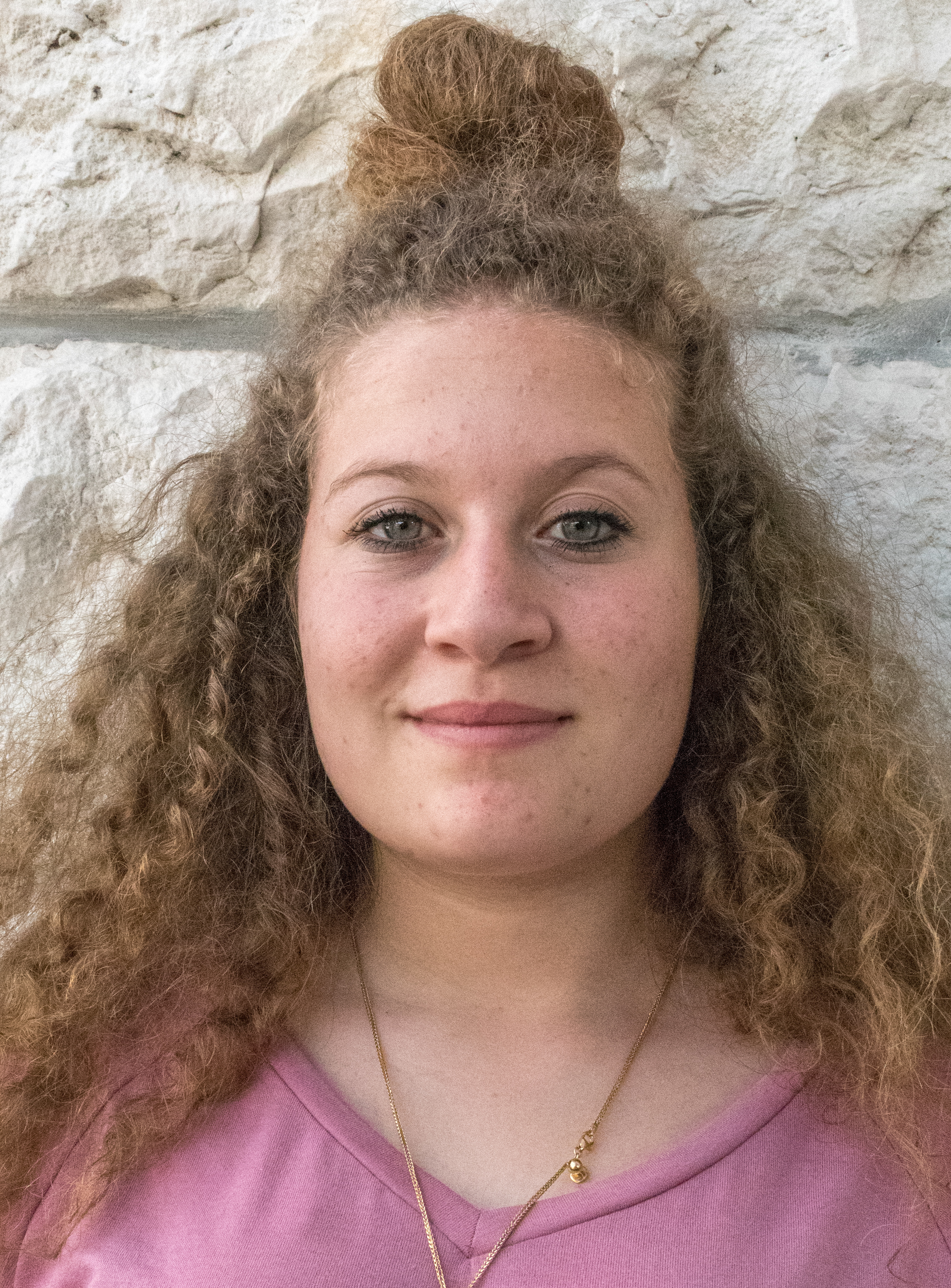
- Tamimi in 2018
- Born: 31 January 2001 (age 25); Nabi Salih, Israeli-occupied West Bank, Palestine
- Known for: Activism
- Father: Bassem Tamimi

Ahed Tamimi (Arabic: عهد التميمي, romanized: ‘Ahad at-Tamīmī, also romanized Ahd; born 31 January 2001) is a Palestinian activist from the village of Nabi Salih in the Israeli-occupied West Bank. Best known for appearances in photos and videos in which she confronts Israeli soldiers, she has been hailed by pro-Palestinian activists as a symbol of Palestinian resistance against the Israeli occupation. Her memoir They Called Me a Lioness was published in 2022.

In December 2017, Tamimi was detained by Israeli authorities for slapping a soldier, which was filmed and went viral, attracting international interest and debate. Tamimi was sentenced to eight months in prison after agreeing to a plea bargain and released on 29 July 2018. After her father was arrested and placed under administrative detention during the Gaza war, she too was arrested again in November, in connection to an Instagram post allegedly belonging to her that called for a massacre of Israeli settlers in the West Bank. She was released on 29 November, as part of an exchange deal between Israel and Hamas.

== Early life ==
Ahed Tamimi was born on 31 January 2001 in Nabi Salih, a small village in the West Bank in the Palestinian territories to activist Bassem Tamimi and his wife, Nariman. According to a The Guardian journalist, Bassem and his children "have known only a life of checkpoints, identity papers, detentions, house demolitions, intimidation, humiliation and violence. This is their normality." Ahed's father is a cousin of Ahlam Tamimi, known for assisting in carrying out the Sbarro restaurant suicide bombing in Jerusalem in 2001.

According to her father Bassem, Tamimi is subjected to harassment by Israeli forces when she's recognized, prompting the Tamimis to move her to a relative's home in Ramallah, where she could continue her secondary education without having to pass through Israeli checkpoints. Bassem said that the family home, which had been slated for demolition just prior to the village's adoption of its weekly protests in 2010, had been subjected to more than 150 military raids by September 2017.

== Activism ==
Tamimi has been involved in protests and political agitation expressing her opposition to the expansion of Israeli settlements and detention of Palestinians. She has argued that documented, organized protests against the Israeli occupation will lead to wider recognition of the Palestinian struggle for autonomy; her viral images and videos have produced a wave of public reactions in Israel and Palestine, as well as internationally.

At 11 years old, Tamimi was commended by Palestinian president Mahmoud Abbas for attempting to intervene during her mother's arrest in August 2012. When an Israeli soldier arrested her older brother in 2012, Tamini was mentioned in the international media. The image of her waving a fist while confronting him went viral on social media, and she was invited to Turkey by the Turkish Prime Minister Recep Tayyip Erdoğan. Three years later she gained attention after she was seen biting and hitting a masked Israeli soldier in the process of taking her younger brother away because he was throwing stones. In December 2016, the United States denied Tamimi a visa to participate in a speaking tour titled "No Child Behind Bars/Living Resistance".

=== Slapping incident ===
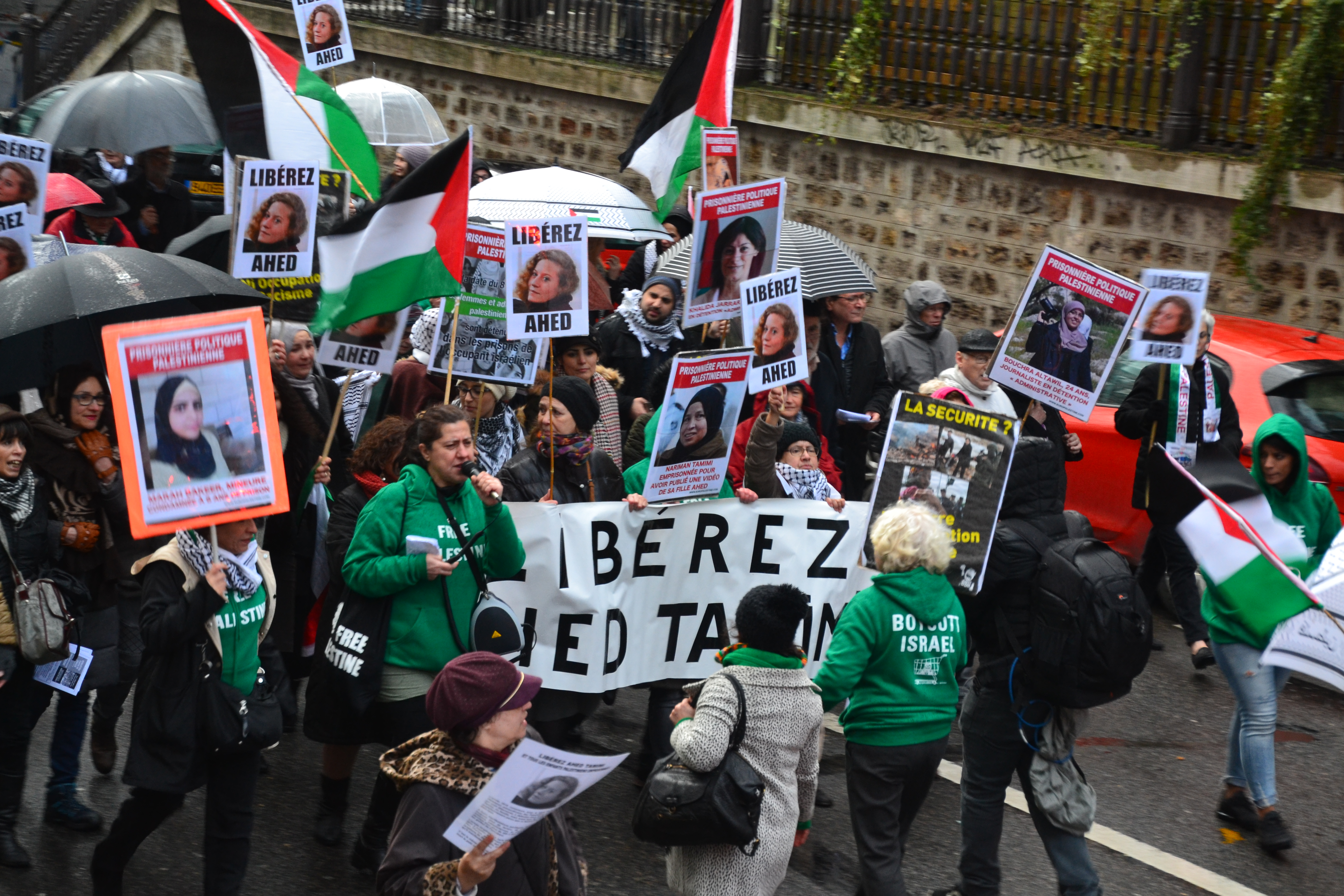
An 8 March 2018 protest in Paris calling for freeing Tamimi from captivity

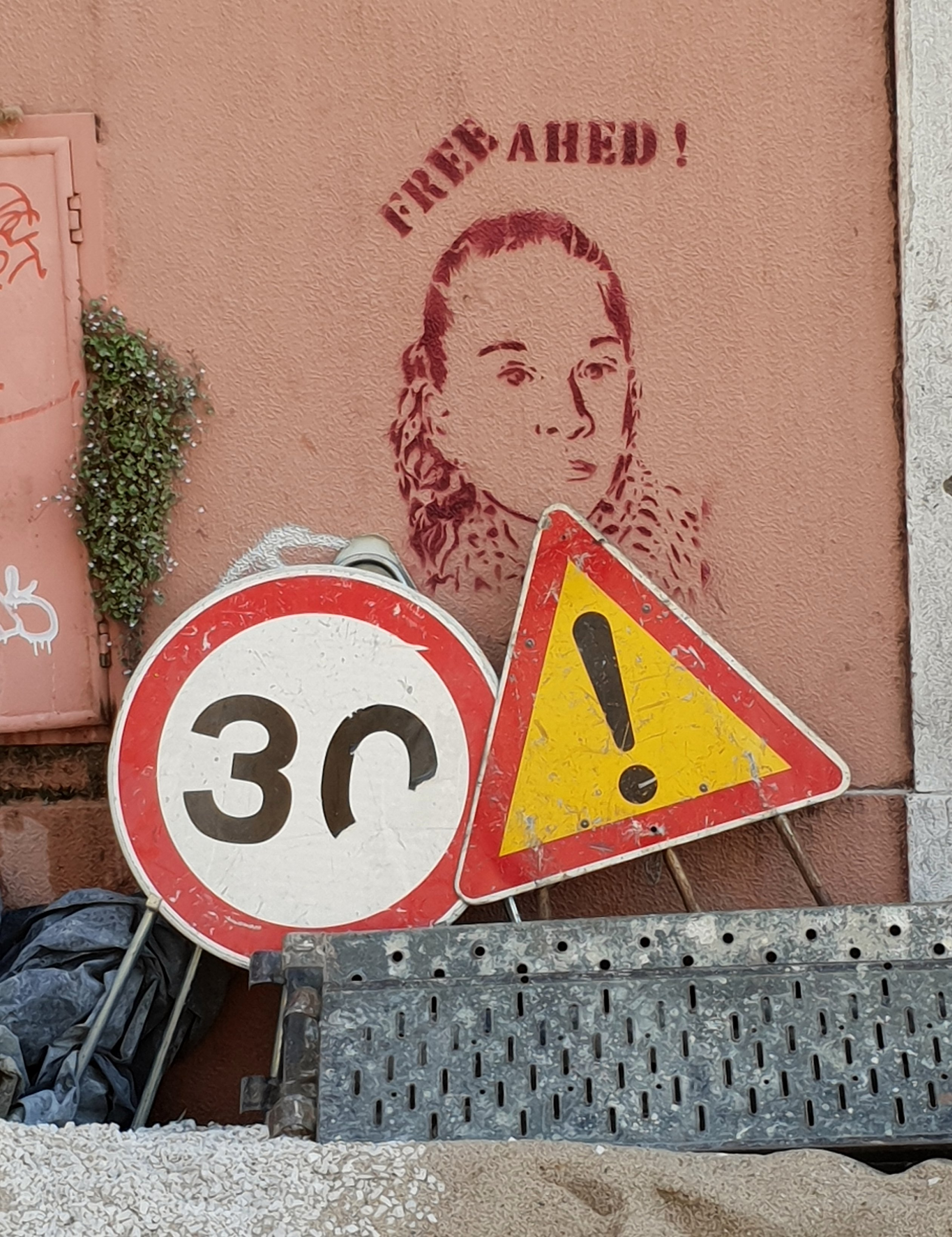
A graffiti of Tamimi in Lisbon, 2018

On 15 December 2017, Tamimi took part in a demonstration in Nabi Salih opposing the expansion of Israeli settlements near her village. The protest turned violent when around 200 of the demonstrators threw stones at Israeli soldiers; the soldiers organized to quell the unrest and entered the Tamimi house to subdue protesters who, according to the army, continued to throw stones from inside the house. According to the Tamimi family, during the protest, Ahed's 15-year-old cousin Mohammed Tamimi was shot in the head at close range with a rubber-coated steel bullet, severely wounding him. In response, Tamimi, along with her mother and cousin Nour, approached the two soldiers outside their home, and were filmed slapping, kicking, and shoving them; the soldiers did not retaliate.

Mohammed Tamimi was put in a medically induced coma to treat his head injury and regained consciousness a few days later. Footage of the slapping incident was uploaded to her mother Nariman Tamimi's Facebook page and went viral. Days later, on 19 December Tamimi was arrested in a nighttime raid.

Despite concerns about the use of military court for a minor who may have been singled out for "embarrassing the occupation", thirteen days later Tamimi was charged with assault, incitement, and throwing stones; her mother and Nour joined her, having been arrested in relation to the incident. Nariman Tamimi was also charged with incitement and assault after posting a video in which the indictment claims Tamimi urged violent attacks against Israel. The case drew global attention and spurred debate over the soldiers' restraint in Palestinian and Israeli societies. Rallies in support of Tamimi took place in North America and Europe.

On 24 March 2018, Tamimi agreed to a plea bargain with prosecutors whereby she would serve eight months in prison and pay a 5,000-shekel ($1,437) fine. As part of the agreement, she pleaded guilty to one count of assault, one count of incitement, and two counts—‌unrelated to the December 2017 incident—‌of obstructing soldiers. While in prison, Tamimi earned her high school degree; she was released on 29 July, resolving to study law and "hold the occupation accountable."

A mural of Tamimi was painted on the Palestinian side of the Israeli West Bank barrier by Italian artist Jorit in collaboration with two other artists (one Italian and one Palestinian) as homage to coincide with her release. All three artists were arrested, with the two Italians being forced to leave Israel.

=== 2023 arrest ===
On 6 November 2023 Tamimi was arrested by IDF soldiers in Nabi Salih on "suspicion of inciting violence and terrorist activities", her house was searched and the family's mobile phones were confiscated.

The arrest followed Israeli media reports of a post on Instagram purported to belong to her that called for a violent massacre of Israeli settlers in the West Bank, referencing Adolf Hitler. Agence France-Presse (AFP) was shown the alleged Instagram post by an Israeli security source when it enquired about the reason for the arrest. Her family denied she has an Instagram account or that she writes in Hebrew, while the alleged post was in Hebrew and Arabic. Tamimi's mother, denying that her daughter had anything to do with the post, said there were "dozens of (online) pages in Ahed's name with her photo, with which she has no connection". Tamimi's father Bassem Tamimi was arrested by Israeli forces a week prior. After having been held for almost three weeks without access to a lawyer, the Israeli government sought to have her held under administrative detention, where she faced indefinite detention without trial or charge. Her lawyer, who did not have access to the evidence against her, said "I’m hopeless to defend her". The usage of administrative detention to hold Palestinians under indefinite detention without a trial has been criticized by international human rights groups, with the Middle East and North Africa region director for PEN International saying that "This form of detention has been systematically used by the Israeli authorities to subjugate and silence Palestinians, including writers, for decades".

Tamimi was released on 29 November as part of an agreement for the release of hostages captured by Hamas on 7 October. No charges were filed against her in the three weeks she was held, and her lawyer said she was beaten during her arrest and after her transfer outside of the West Bank to a prison in Israel. The transfer of prisoners from occupied territory is illegal under international law. Responding to the accusation that she was beaten, the Israel Prison Service released an image of her smiling in her cell.

== Reception ==
Tamimi has been described as one of the new symbols of Palestinian resistance to Israeli military occupation in the West Bank. Many Palestinians have protested their living conditions, but Tamimi is one of the few internationally recognized figures of the cause, credited with energizing Palestinians demoralized by years of Israeli settlement building and bringing renewed attention to Israel's occupation of the West Bank; her case also highlighted Israel's detention and prosecution of Palestinian minors. Ben Ehrenreich, a journalist who documented the Tamimi family in 2012, saw her physical appearance as a factor in her celebrity; "A great deal of work goes into 'othering' Palestinians," he wrote, "to casting them as some really recognizable other." Ehrenreich continued: "when suddenly the kid [Tamimi] doesn't fit into those stereotypes—when she actually looks like a European kid or an American kid—then suddenly all that work of dehumanization can't function." Since 2010, the Israeli military detained and prosecuted 8,000 Palestinian children.

Israelis consider her actions staged performances aimed at discrediting Israel. She and her family have been denounced in Israel as "terrorist sympathizers". Others, including Israeli parliamentarian Michael Oren, accuse her of dressing up in "American clothes" to provoke responses from soldiers. Some Palestinians have also suggested that the viral video may have hurt their cause by showing the soldiers behaving passively.

== Media ==
=== Poem ===
In February 2018, Israeli poet Yehonatan Geffen posted a poem on his Instagram page that compared Tamimi to Joan of Arc, Hannah Senesh and Anne Frank. In response, defense minister Avigdor Lieberman demanded that Israel's popular Army Radio ban Geffen's work, and culture minister Miri Regev said Geffen was "crossing a red line by someone seeking to rewrite history." During a performance, Geffen offered apologies to those who were offended by the comparisons to figures of the Holocaust, but did not remove the poem from his Instagram profile.

=== Films ===
Jesse Roberts of Rise Up International and Jesse Locke of AMZ Productions filmed a documentary, Radiance of Resistance, that featured the then 14-year-old Tamimi and 9-year-old Janna Jihad. In 2017, it was screened worldwide at a number of festivals, including the Respect Human Rights Film Festival in Belfast, Northern Ireland, where it won Best Documentary. The Singapore Government's Media Development Authority (IMDA) banned public screenings of the film for its "skewed narrative" which could cause "disharmony" in the country. The government's ban was described as censorship.

The 2021 drama Ahed's Knee by Nadav Lapid was inspired by Tamimi's story.

=== Memoir ===
In 2022, while studying for a B.A. degree, Tamimi published a memoir, They Called Me a Lioness, together with American journalist Dena Takruri.

Kirkus Reviews called it "An expertly crafted, trenchant memoir from a formidable activist." The Middle East Monitor (MEMO) described the book as "an emotional and powerful narrative" and awarded it a Palestine Book Award. The Jerusalem Post said "For those who wish merely to sympathize (and sometimes that is enough), this memoir serves its purpose fairly well. But for those who hope to better understand the reason that Israelis and Palestinians glare at one another with such mutual hostility and suspicion, and why there is so much violence coming from both sides, this book will just not do." Haaretz said "Ultimately, Tamimi's memoir serves the Palestinian struggle poorly because it embraces a nationalist populism and doesn't take a deeper look at the Palestinian struggle after more than 55 years of occupation."
