= Dena Takruri =

American journalist (born 1983)

- دينا تكروري
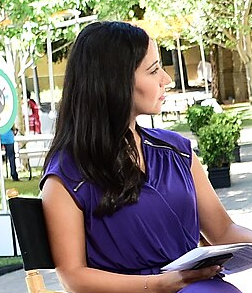
- Born: San Francisco, California, U.S.
- Education: University of California, Berkeley (BA); Georgetown University (MA)
- Occupations: Journalist; television host/producer
- Years active: 2006–present
- Employer: AJ+

Dena Takruri (Arabic: دينا تكروري) is a Palestinian-American journalist, on-air presenter, and digital producer with AJ+, an online news service owned by Al Jazeera Media Network. She is the host of the award-winning AJ+ docuseries Direct From with Dena Takruri, which focuses on domestic and international breaking news, political issues, and social justice movements.

The videos that Takruri hosts range in format from in-studio explainers that provide context to the news stories, to interviews with experts and stakeholders, and ground reports from the locations of rapid news developments. Specific subjects that she has covered include the Israeli–Palestinian conflict; the Korean conflict; the Black Lives Matter movement, American police brutality, and mass incarceration in the United States; and the 2016 United States presidential election.

== Early life ==
Dena Takruri is of Palestinian descent. She attended University of California, Berkeley, earning a Bachelor of Arts in International Development Studies. She completed her graduate work at Georgetown University in Arab Studies. Takruri is a graduate of Lowell High School.

== Career ==
Dena Takruri began her broadcast career in 2007 as co-host and producer on a weekly hour-long satellite television program called What's Happening that aired on Arab Radio and Television Network (ART). The show, which aired in North America, focused on current political, cultural and social issues related to Arab-Americans.

She also worked as a research assistant with Dr. Rochelle Davis of Georgetown University between January 2007 and April 2008. One of her duties included interviewing U.S. military personnel who served in Iraq for a project on their perceptions of Iraqi culture and U.S. military cultural training. The findings of this research were presented at a historians’ conference in Atlanta, Georgia, in April 2008. They were ultimately published in a chapter of a book titled "Anthropology and Global Counter Insurgency." In 2008, Takruri also contributed Arabic-to-English translations for the award-winning feature documentary film Budrus.

Takruri joined Al Jazeera Arabic in Washington D.C. in 2008 as a producer on its weekly live current affairs show hosted by Abderrahim Foukara that examines the impact of U.S. politics on the Arab region. There, she produced interviews with prominent political figures including Donald Rumsfeld, Robert Gates, Dominique Strauss-Kahn, Tony Blair, John McCain, and Mahmoud Ahmadinejad. Takruri joined HuffPost Live, the online streaming network of the Huffington Post, as a producer and host in June 2012. She was part of the original launch team and covered global affairs, politics, lifestyle and culture. She is now a presenter and producer at AJ+, Al Jazeera's all digital video news network targeted towards millennials.

Takruri has reported domestically from Charleston, South Carolina in the aftermath of the church shooting. She also covered the armed occupation of the federal wildlife reserve in Oregon and the water crisis in Flint, Michigan. Internationally, Takruri covered Europe's refugee crisis, embedding with refugees and crossing borders with them while broadcasting in English and Arabic. She also reported from the West Bank during intensified tensions in the fall of 2015. Her videos have gone viral, netting millions of views on Facebook and hundreds of thousands of shares on YouTube.

== Direct From with Dena Takruri ==
Since June 2015, Takruri has been the host of the AJ+ field docuseries Direct From with Dena Takruri. The show focuses on both international and domestic breaking news, issues and social justice movements. Past episodes have covered the Korean Demilitarized Zone, the Cape Town water crisis, the Catalan independence movement and homelessness in Skid Row, Los Angeles.

Direct From with Dena Takruri has been recognized by multiple awards, including two Edward R. Murrow Awards, a Webby Award, a Shorty Award, and a Clarion Award. The episode "One Day in Hebron" (retitled "How Israeli Apartheid Destroyed My Hometown" on its YouTube page) won a Peabody Award in 2023.

Takruri was one of the first journalists who interviewed Palestinian activist Ahed Tamimi after her release from Israeli prison and helped write her memoir, which was published in 2022. The book won a Palestine Book Award.

== Personal life ==
Takruri is proficient in Arabic and English. She identifies as a Muslim.
