= Anarchists Against the Wall =

Israeli anarchist group

- אנרכיסטים נגד גדרות
- Leader: None
- Dates active: 2003–unknown
- Active regions: Israel, West Bank, Jerusalem
- Ideology: Anarchism
- Status: Active

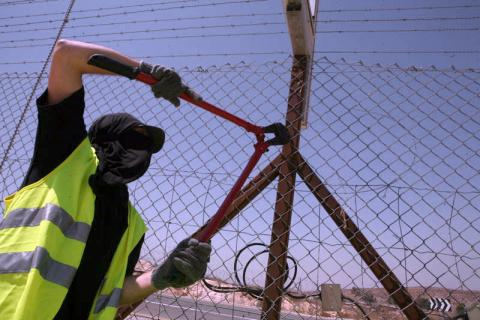
Destroying fences at the border by the AAtW, 2007

Anarchists Against the Wall (AAtW; Hebrew: אנרכיסטים נגד גדרות) sometimes called "Anarchists Against Fences" or "Jews Against Ghettos", was a direct action group composed of Israeli anarchists and anti-authoritarians who opposed the construction of the Israeli West Bank barrier.

A member of Anarchists Against the Wall described the construction of the barrier as part of a strategy of ethnic cleansing, "one of the greatest threats the Palestinian population has known over the last century... which is to make life so appalling for the Palestinian people that they will be left with one choice: move out."

The group disbanded, at least in part due to the decline in Palestinian popular resistance in the late 2010s.

A collection of writings by various anti-wall activists under the name Anarchists Against the Wall: Direct Action and Solidarity with the Palestinian Popular Struggle was published in the English language by AK Press in 2013.

== Activities ==
The activists routinely broke the law, based on their position that the construction of the West Bank barrier was illegal according to international law, making the barrier itself illegitimate. Their direct action took the form of entering closed-off military zones, burning tires, halting construction work, damaging or tearing down sections of the barrier, breaking through gates of the barrier, and throwing stones. The military responses against the Palestinians, Israelis, and foreign national activists included tear gas canisters, rubber-coated metal bullets, concussion grenades, and at times live ammunition.

On 26 December 2003, during an AAtW demonstration near the village of Mas'ha, the Israel Defense Forces fired shots after demonstrators started to shake the locked gate in the fence. Israeli anarchist and former paratrooper Gil Na'amati was shot in both legs. This got a great deal of media coverage, leading the group to keep what had been a temporary name that it was using at the moment.

== See also ==
- Anarchism in Israel
- Israeli–Palestinian conflict
- Jonathan Pollak
- Refusenik
- Ta'ayush
- Uri Gordon (anarchist)
