= Anarchism in Egypt =

Anarchism in Egypt refers both to the historical Egyptian anarchist movement which emerged in the 1860s and lasted until the 1940s, and to the anarchist movement as it has re-emerged in the early 2000s. Anarchism was introduced to Egypt by Italian immigrant workers and political exiles in the 1860s. The Italian community in Egypt was one of numerous such communities of expatriate workers whose presence in Egypt dated to the modernisation programme of Muhammad Ali, Wāli (or Governor) of Egypt from 1805 to 1849, as part of which the immigration of foreigners with useful skills was encouraged. This process was accelerated under Ali's successors, in particular with the construction of the Suez Canal in the 1850s.

Many leading figures of the global anarchist movement, including Errico Malatesta, Amilcare Cipriani, Élisée Reclus, Luigi Galleani, and Pietro Gori passed through Egypt at various points and for various reasons, owing to its position as a relatively safe haven for political dissidents and close proximity to Europe. The movement re-entered global view when a number of anarchist groups took part in the 2011 Egyptian revolution, namely the Egyptian Libertarian Socialist Movement and Black Flag.

== History ==
=== Emergence: 1860s–1910s ===
Anarchism was introduced to Egypt by Italian immigrant workers and political exiles in the 1860s. The Italian community in Egypt was one of numerous such communities of expatriate workers whose presence in Egypt dated to the modernisation programme of Muhammad Ali, Wāli (or Governor) of Egypt from 1805 to 1849, as part of which the immigration of foreigners with useful skills was encouraged. This process was accelerated under Ali's successors, in particular with the construction of the Suez Canal in the 1850s.

The Italian Workers Society (Italian: Società Operaia Italiana), established in Alexandria in the early 1860s, was the first organisation among the Italian expatriate community which began to move towards anarchism. By the middle of the 1870s, the arrival of veterans of Giuseppe Garibaldi's campaigns and other radicals lead to the establishment of Thought and Action (Italian: Pensiero ed Azione), a political association along Mazzinian lines. In 1876, a more radical grouping split from this and was recognised as the official Alexandrine section of the anarchist First International. Additional sections were formed in Cairo, Port Said and Ismailia over the next year, and the Egyptian sections presented their first report to the International at its Verviers Congress in September 1877. Although at this, early stage the movement was strongly Italian in character, the published proceedings of the Verviers Congress demonstrate that the Alexandrine section, with the support of the one in Cairo, and the Greek Federation, successfully sponsored a proposal calling for the dissemination throughout the eastern Mediterranean of anarchist literature "in Italian, Illyrian, Greek, Turkish and Arabic". The International dissolved shortly after and the resolution came to nothing, but it clearly demonstrated the aspiration of the fledgling Egyptian anarchist movement to expand beyond its initial exclusively Italian base.

Many leading figures of the global anarchist movement, including Errico Malatesta, Amilcare Cipriani, Élisée Reclus, Luigi Galleani, and Pietro Gori passed through Egypt at various points and for various reasons, owing to its position as a relatively safe haven for political dissidents and close proximity to Europe. In July 1881 when anarchist delegates convened in London to establish the International Working People's Association (or "Black International"), the Egyptian sections – in federation with anarchists in Istanbul – were represented by Malatesta, then resident in Egypt. By this time, the Alexandrine anarchists had established a European Social Studies Circle (Italian: Circolo europeo di studii sociali), in which they held discussions on social questions, and had set up a clandestine press for the printing of posters. Later in the same year a conference was convened at Sidi Gaber and attended by approximately 100 delegates from anarchist groups across Egypt.

During much of this period, Egypt had been in a sustained political crisis. Egypt fell into heavy debt, incurred to fund extensive infrastructure development and the lavish lifestyle of the Khedive (or Viceroy), Isma'il Pasha. Unable to repay, Egypt had been forced in 1876 to accept European control over its treasury. In 1879, under British and French pressure, Isma'il was deposed by the Sultan and succeeded by his son Tewfik Pasha who moved to appease European creditors. A power struggle developed between elements of the Turko-Circassian elite on the one hand and nationalist officers led by Ahmed Urabi on the other who wanted a constitutional government. By the beginning of 1882 Urabi was War Minister and was confronted by hostile British and French governments wanting to defend European investments from his perceived anti-foreigner stance. Despite his characterisation as anti-foreign, however, Urabi, in fact, did receive support from elements of the foreign community, including Italian workers and a sizeable number of anarchists. In June that year British forces bombarded Alexandria before landing and marching against Urabi. Following his defeat at the Battle of Tel el-Kebir, the British occupation of the rest of the country followed shortly.

=== Re-emergence: early 2010s–present ===
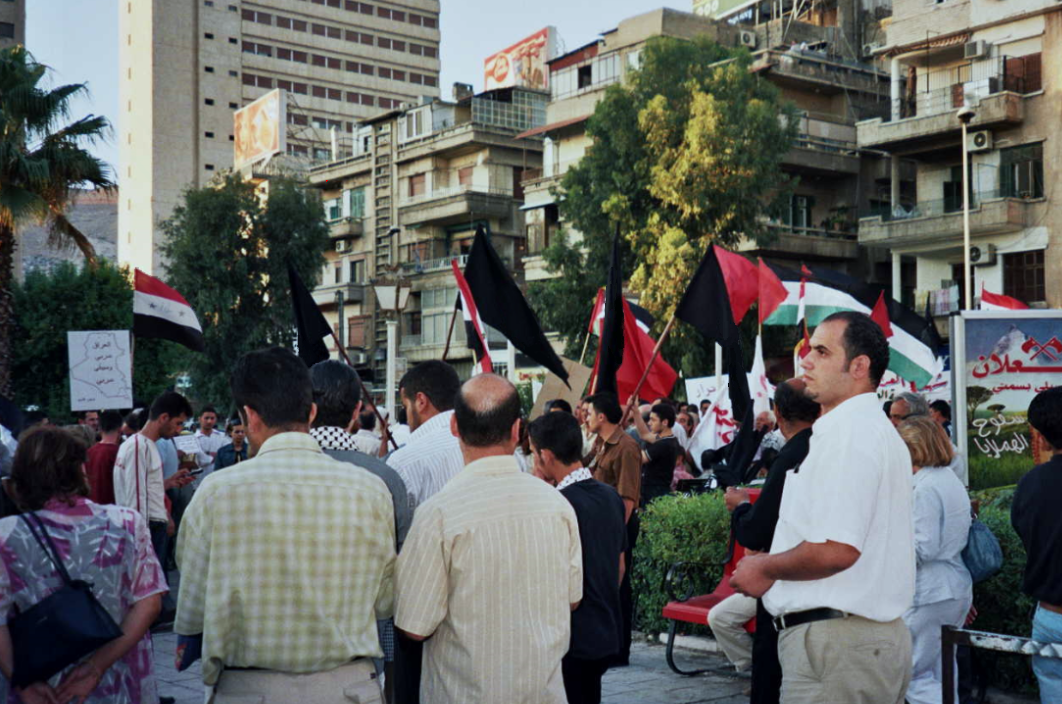
Anarchist protest in Egypt, against the Iraq War, pictured 2005

The movement re-entered the global view when a number of anarchist groups took part in the 2011 Egyptian revolution, namely the Egyptian Libertarian Socialist Movement and Black Flag. The Egyptian anarchists have come under attack from the military regime and the Muslim Brotherhood. On October 7, 2011, the Egyptian Libertarian Socialist Movement held its first conference in Cairo.

== Organisations ==
- Black Flag (2010s–)
- Libertarian Socialist Movement (2011–)

== See also ==
- List of anarchist movements by region
- Anarchism in Africa
- Anarchism in Israel
