= Jonathan Pollak =

Israeli graphic designer

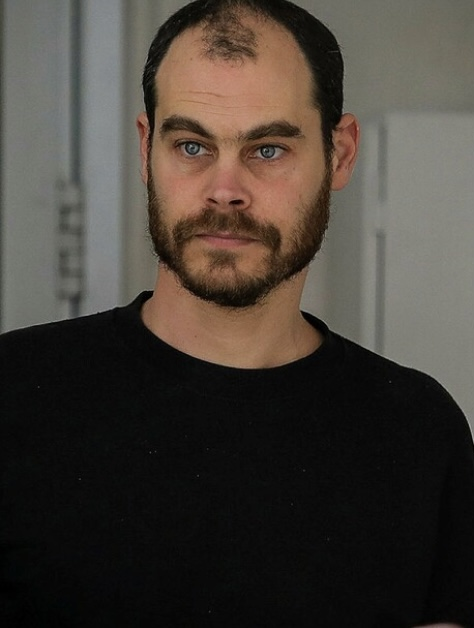
Jonathan Pollak, 2021

Jonathan Pollak (Hebrew: יונתן פולק; born c. 1982) is a graphic designer who works for Haaretz. He co-founded the direct action group Anarchists Against the Wall.

== Early life ==
Jonathan Pollak was born in Tel Aviv, Israel to Yossi Pollak, an actor and Tami, a psychologist. He is an Ashkenazi Jew. His maternal grandfather, Nimrod Eshel, was imprisoned for leading a strike by seamen during the 1950s. As a teenager, Pollak was involved in the Israeli hardcore punk scene, which in the 1990s was strongly tied to anarchism, and became a straight edge. At the same time, Pollak became a vegan and an animal rights activist; years later he would state that "racism, chauvinism, sexism, speciesism all come from the same place of belittling the other".

Jonathan Pollak is the brother of actor Avshalom Pollak and film director Shai Pollak.

== Activism ==
In 2003, Pollak co-founded the organization Anarchists Against the Wall, which protests the Israeli West Bank barrier. He participated in protests in Budrus in 2003 and 2004. In the mid-2000s, he joined protests against the barrier wall in Bil'in.

Pollak was struck in the head by a tear gas canister fired by an Israeli soldier in April 2005, requiring stitches. An Israel Defense Forces (IDF) spokesperson stated that the canister had first struck a rock and then hit Pollak on a ricochet.

In October 2010, Pollak was fined $1,250 for participating in an illegal demonstration against the barrier. On 27 December 2010, he was sentenced to three months in prison for illegal assembly after participating in a January 2008 bicycle ride protest. He declined an offer by the court to have his sentence commuted to community service. Pollak was released in February 2011 after having his sentence reduced for good behavior. He returned to demonstrating at the Palestinian village of Nabi Salih within the week.

After the death of Jawaher Abu Rahmah in January 2011, from tear gas fired by Israeli soldiers, Pollak criticized Israel's use of the gas, which he said was banned in Europe in the 60s and 70s. In May 2012, Pollak protested at the trial of Bassem al-Tamimi, a Nabi Saleh protest leader accused of organizing stone throwers and holding illegal demonstrations.

Pollak supports the international Boycott, Divestment and Sanctions (BDS) movement. He is quoted in a book published in 2012 comparing Ni'lin to Soweto and expressing the view that a strong BDS movement could generate change." He has defended Palestinian stone throwing as a moral act of self-empowerment.

Calls for the release of Jonathan Pollak following his arrest in Beita protest. February 2023

On 27 February 2018, a criminal complaint was filed against him and other members of Anarchists Against the Fence by Ad Kan. He was accused of assaulting soldiers and police, and organizing protests that led to the injury of Israeli security forces. On 6 January 2020, Pollak was arrested for not showing up in court hearings related to the case. He said he did not accept the authority of Israeli courts to hear matters relating to resisting "Israeli colonial rule”.

In early July 2019, Pollak was assaulted by two men outside of his workplace who slashed him across the face with a knife. Pollak did not report the attack to the police on the grounds that they did more harm than good: "The police is the last place in the world I'd go to for protection."

On 6 September 2024, Pollak attended the weekly demonstration in Beita. He was at the protest when Ayşenur Ezgi Eygi was shot and killed. The same day, he provided an account of the events leading to her death to Associated Press.

== See also ==
- Anarchism in Israel
