= Nabi Salih =

Village in the Ramallah and el-Bireh Governorate of West Bank

- Local Development Committee

Arabic transcription(s)
  - Arabic: النبي صالح
  - Latin: an-Nabi Salih (official); Nabi Saleh (unofficial)
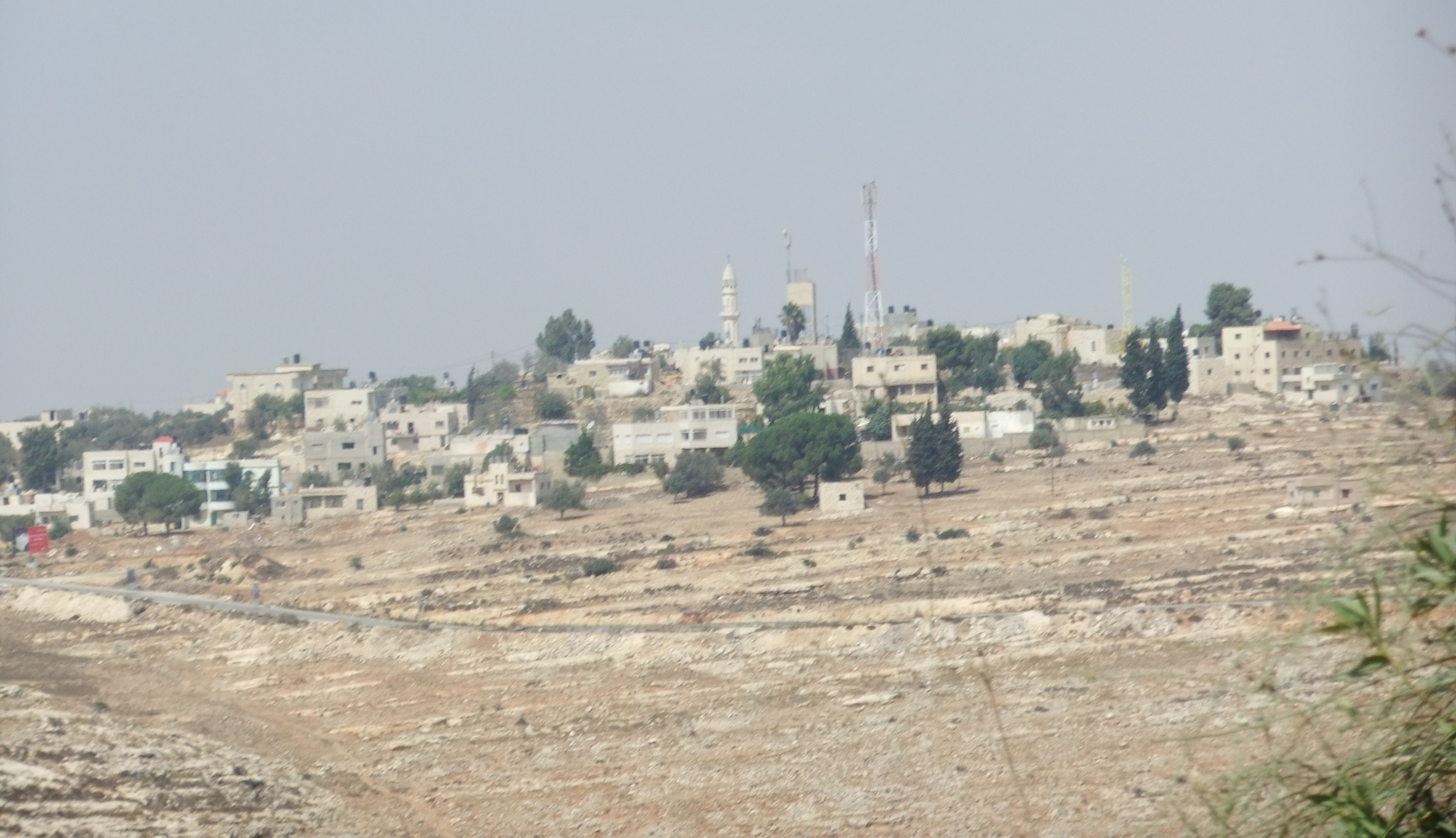

- Location of Nabi Salih within Palestine
- Coordinates: 32°01′0″N 35°7′29″E
- Palestine grid: 161/158
- State: State of Palestine
- Governorate: Ramallah and al-Bireh

Government
  - Type: Local Development Committee

Area
  - Total: 2.8 km^{2} (1.1 sq mi)

Population (2017)
  - Total: 522
  - Density: 190/km^{2} (480/sq mi)
- Name meaning: "The Prophet Salih"

Nabi Salih (Arabic: النبي صالح al-Nabī ṣālḥ; alternatively spelled Nabi Saleh) is a small Palestinian village in the Ramallah and al-Bireh Governorate in the central West Bank, located 20 kilometers northwest of Ramallah. It had a population of 522 in 2017. In 2010-2016 weekly protest marches were organized by the villagers to fight against the occupation of the West Bank. According to data compiled by Mondoweiss, 350 villagers were injured in clashes with Israeli troops during this time.

== History ==
Sherds from the Roman and Byzantine era have been found here.

In 1929, Alt suggested to identify the site with Aenan, a place mentioned in Eusebius' Onomasticon.

=== Ottoman era ===
Nabi Salih, like all of Palestine, was incorporated into the Ottoman Empire in 1517, and sherds from the early Ottoman era have also been found here. In the 1596 tax record, the village appeared (with the name Dayr Salih) as being in the nahiya of Quds in the liwa of Quds. It had a population of 2 households, both Muslim. They paid a fixed tax-rate of 33.3% on agricultural products, including wheat, barley and summer crops, in addition to occasional revenues; a total of 550 akçe.

The French explorer Victor Guérin visited the place twice in the 19th century. In 1863 he scaled the nearby height, and in 1870 he noted that the place was named after a person who "is venerated there under a koubbeh partially constructed with regular stonework with an appearance of antiquity." In 1870 Guérin estimated that the village had 150 inhabitants, while an Ottoman village list from about the same year showed that "Nebi Salih" had 5 houses and a population of 22, though the population count included men only.

In 1882, the PEF's Survey of Western Palestine described Neby Saleh as: "a village of moderate size on a ridge, with a small mosque and a well to the south. A spring exists about three-quarters of a mile east."

In 1896 the population of Nabi Salih was estimated to be about 102 persons.

=== British Mandate ===
In the 1922 census of Palestine, conducted by the British Mandate of Palestine, there were 105 people living in Nabi Salih, all Muslims, rising to 144 in the 1931 census.

In the 1945 statistics, the population was 170, all Muslims, while the total land area was 2,846 dunams, according to an official land and population survey. Of this, 862 were plantations and irrigable land, 669 for cereals, while 11 dunams were classified as built-up (urban) areas.

=== Jordanian era ===
In the wake of the 1948 Arab–Israeli War, and after the 1949 Armistice Agreements, Nabi Salih came under Jordanian rule. It was annexed by Jordan in 1950.

In 1961, the population was 337.

=== Post-1967 ===
Since the Six-Day War in 1967, Nabi Salih has been under Israeli occupation.

The population decreased substantially after the Six-Day War, due to residents fleeing the site towards other Palestinian localities or Jordan. In 1982, the population reached 179.

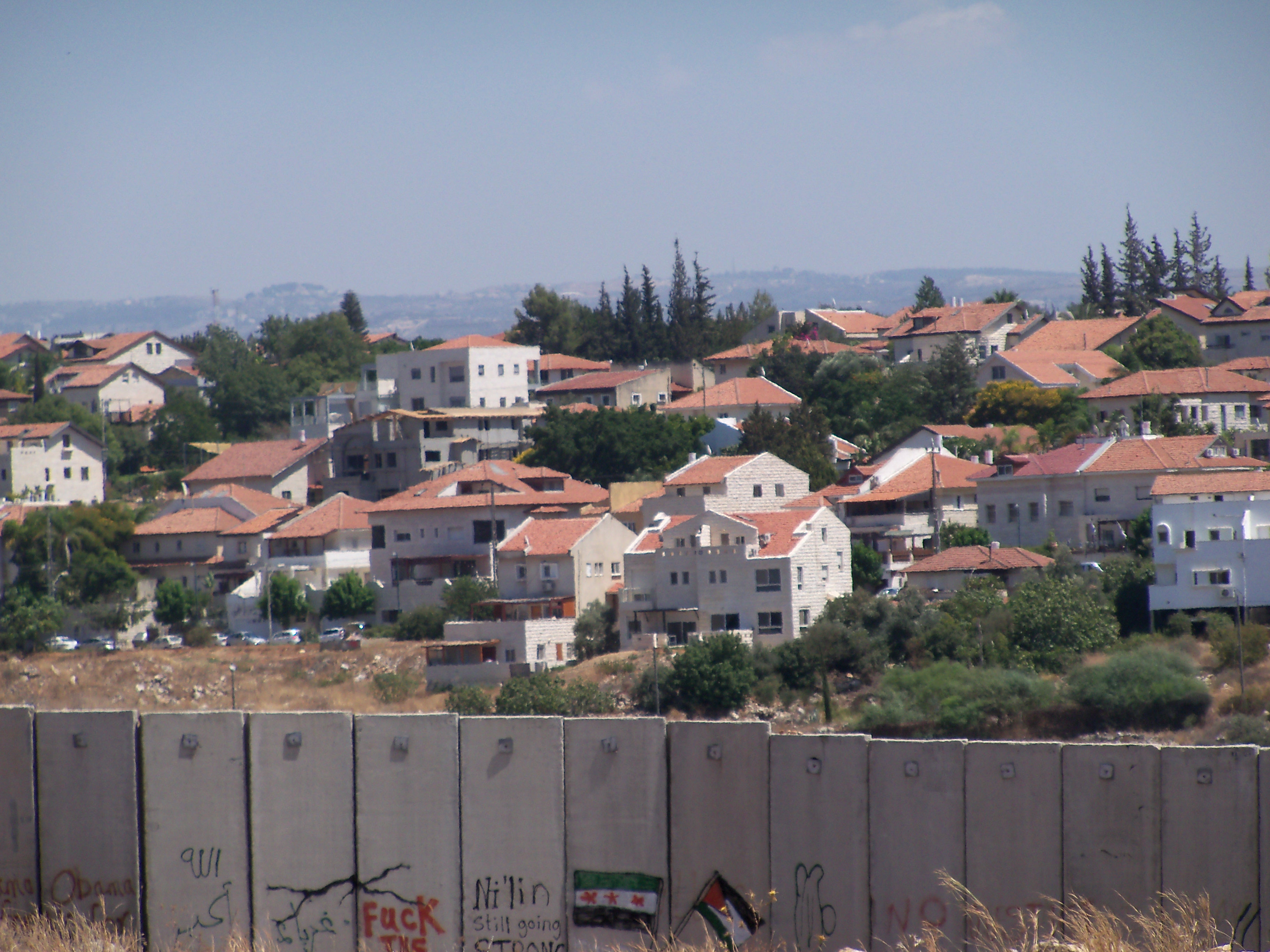
Behind the Israeli separation wall, the settlement of Halamish, built on land confiscated from the Palestinian village of Nabi Salih, in the occupied West Bank, July 2013

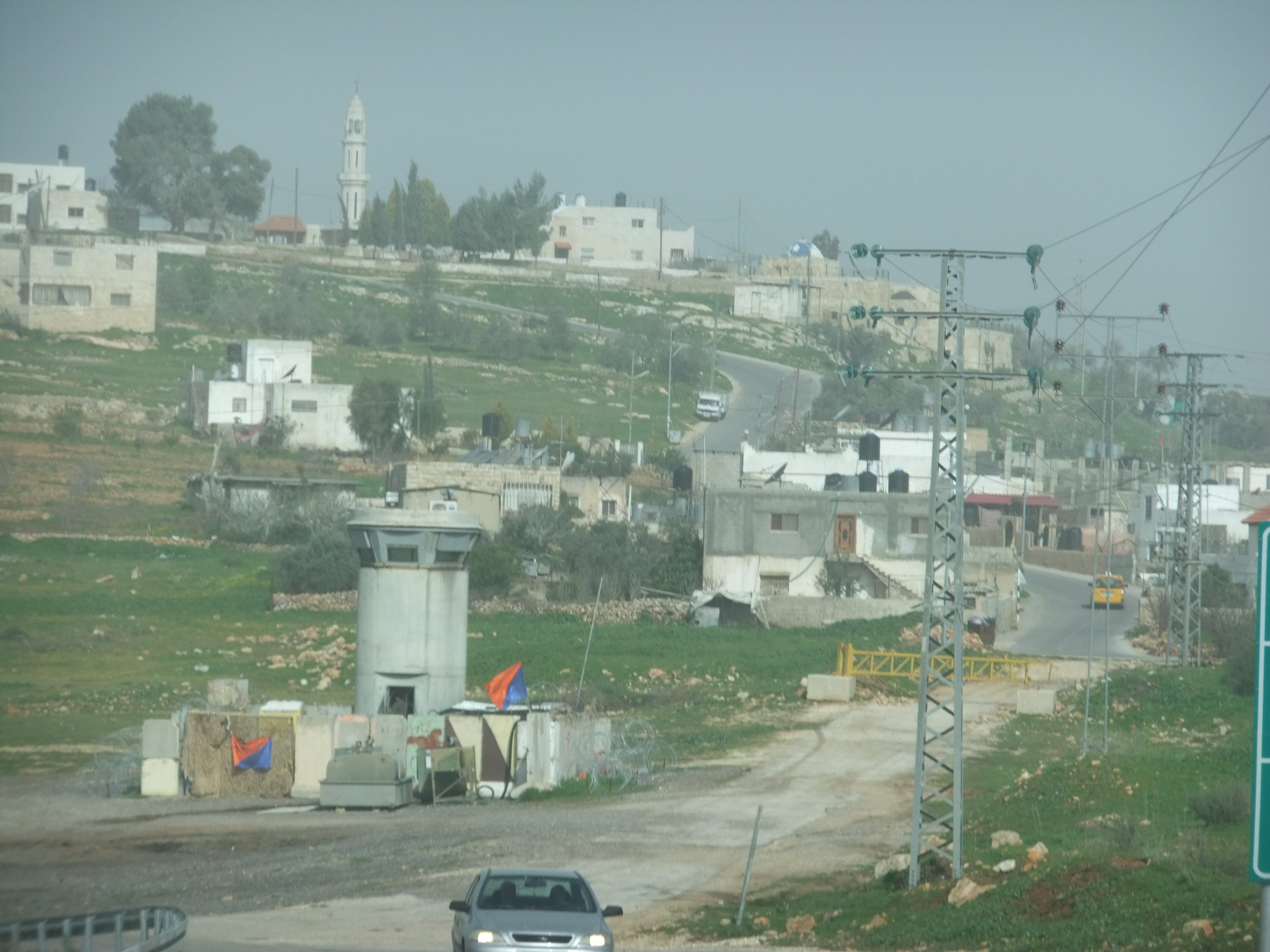
Israeli military checkpoint controlling access to the Palestinian village of Nabi Salih, March 2012

== Shrine of Salih ==
Local tradition identifies the blue-color-domed building complex in the village with the shrine of the prophet Salih (Biblical Shelah). The modern structure was built in the 19th century during Ottoman rule. The building included a zawiya, a Sufi lodging space and was guarded by a watchman. It was situated on the remains of a Crusader structure, which was presumably built atop the ruins of a Byzantine-era church. The remains of the Crusader-Byzantine structure include apses of a three-aisle chapel located behind the shrine complex.

The maqam (shrine) of Nabi Salih was the most important religious structure, out of 16 different edifices, in the Bani Zeid region. It served as a gathering place for families during two rites of passage for their young sons: collective circumcisions and first haircuts. These events were followed by celebratory picnics and games. Coinciding with Easter Week celebrated by the local Christians, Muslims from the area would visit the Nabi Salih shrine and from there would depart for the annual procession to the al-Aqsa Mosque compound and the Nabi Musa ("Prophet Moses") shrine south of Jericho. The inhabitants of the al-Salihiyah neighborhood of Damascus, who claimed descent from the Abbasids, regarded Nabi Salih as the site of their eponym and would travel there to commemorate the site. It was at Nabi Salih that hundreds of men from Deir Ghassaneh and other villages of the Bani Zeid sheikhdom would interact with the wider Arabic-speaking Muslim community from Palestine and the Levant.

In 2003, under the supervision of architect Yara al-Sharif, the complex was restored. It cost $63,000, primarily funded by Sweden. The prayer hall and tomb room are owned by the Islamic waqf authority, but is rented by the Nabi Salih Cultural Centre. Currently, the complex is composed of three floors (including an underground floor) containing the tomb, a large prayer room, an olive press, a water well, a classroom, a multipurpose hall, a double-vaulted lecture room, a courtyard and two front and back terraces. All entrances are semi-circular pointed arches. The An Nabi Salih Cultural Centre serves as the most significant structure in the village.

== Weekly protests ==
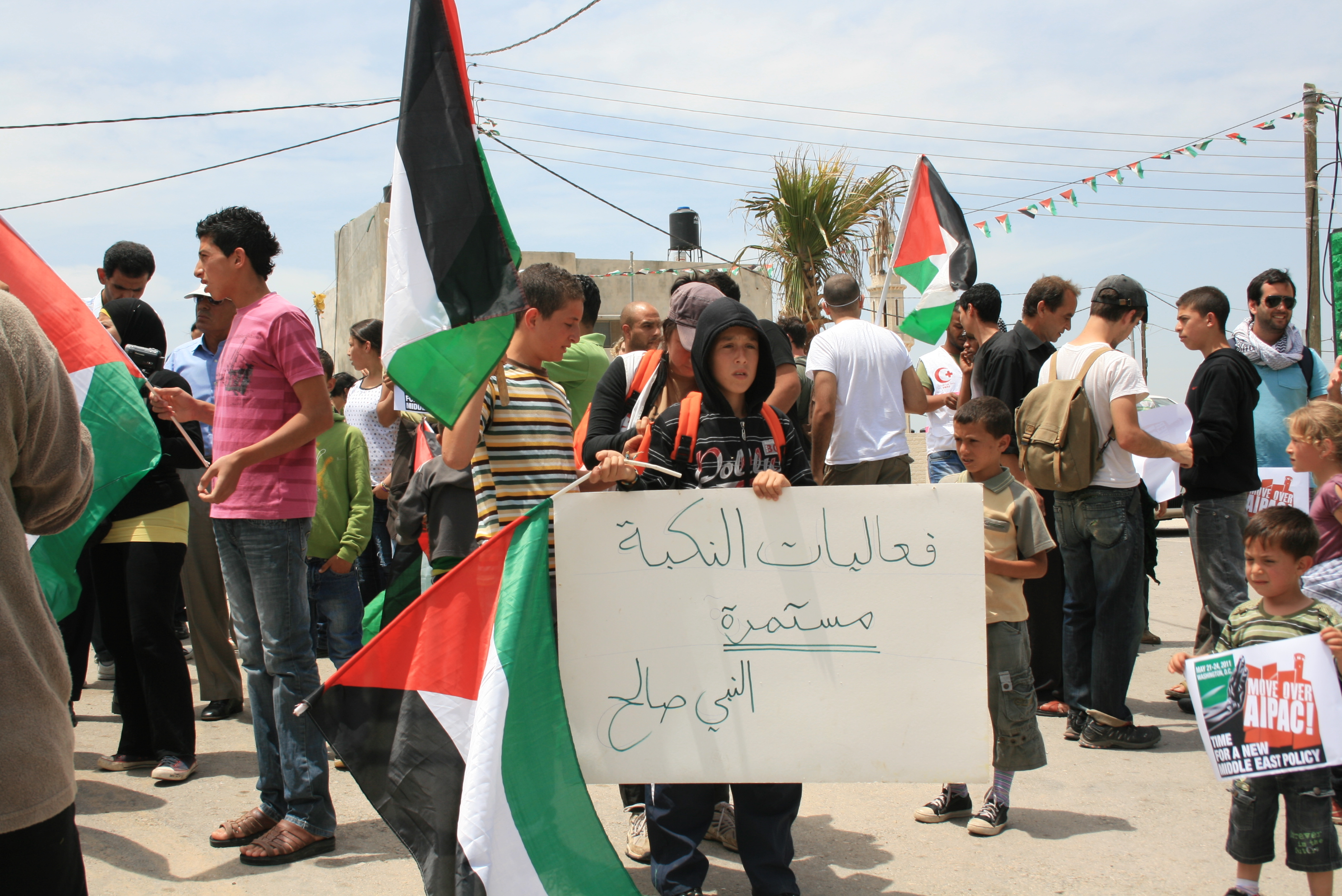
Demonstrators in Nabi Salih, May 2011

Nabi Salih's residents have hosted weekly demonstrations since 2009 protesting what they describe as confiscation of the village's lands and the takeover of their spring by the nearby Israeli settlement, Halamish. According to an IDF officer who had served in the area, the protests started in 2009 over a plot of citrus trees, and beehives, which was set alight by settlers in a price tag attack. IDF soldiers also used to bathe in 3 pools. Settlers put up a sign naming it "Meir's Spring", after Meir Segal, one of the founders of Halamish, weeded the area, put up benches, a pergola and picnic tables, and planted it out with pomegranates, figs and olives. In response to complaints, a staff officer in 2012 ordered the demolition of what the settlers had built. The order has not been carried out. The demonstrations also protest against the expansion of the Halamish settlement over what they claim is private Palestinian land.

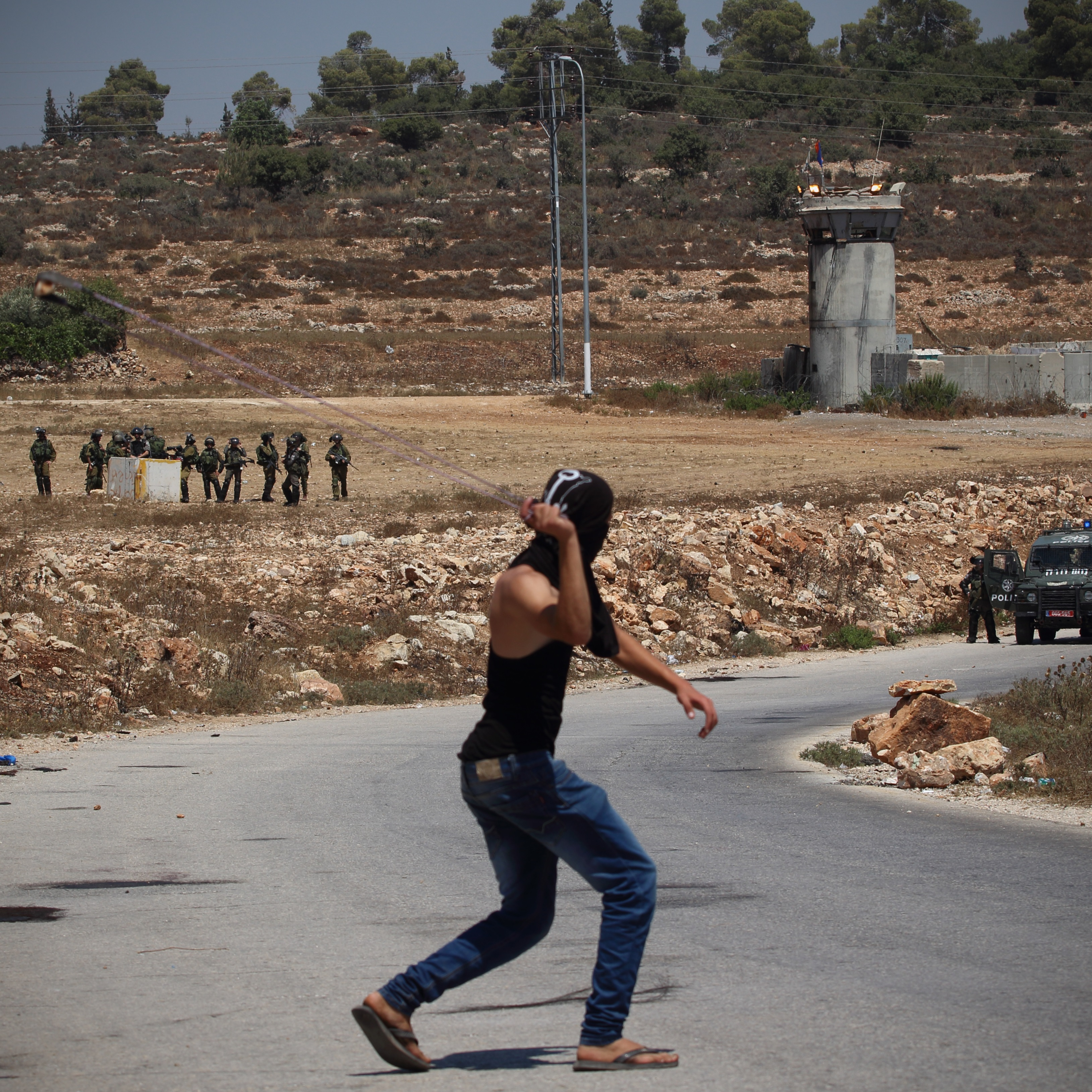
Palestinian demonstrator uses sling against Israeli soldiers in Nabi Salih weekly protest, August 2014

During the protests, there are regular clashes with the Israeli Army who attempt to disperse crowds by using live ammunition, teargas, skunk water, rubber bullets, sound grenades, and other dispersal methods while Palestinian youth respond by hurling stones. The Israeli authorities have attempted to suppress the demonstrations the residents using tactics such as night incursions targeting homes and arrests of alleged stone throwers, including children. On December 11, 2011, Mustafa Tamimi was shot in the face by a teargas canister at close range and later died from his injury, becoming the first resident of Nabi Salih to be killed during a demonstration. The following day, a large group of protesters marched to the entrance of Halamish to commemorate Tamimi, but were stopped by the Israeli Army which arrested 15 demonstrators including Palestinians, Israelis and internationals. Israel later closed the investigation without any repercussion against the soldier who had fired the shots.

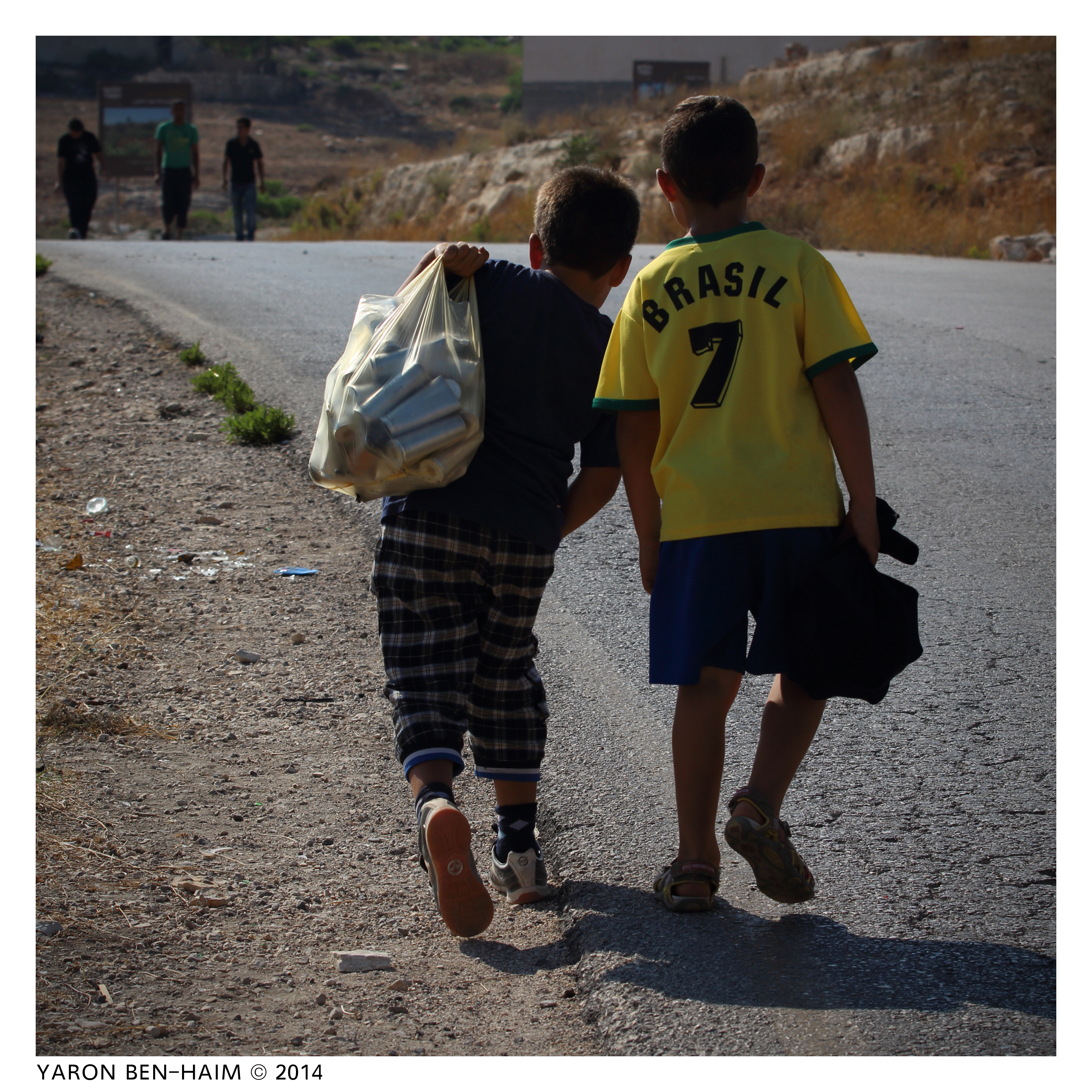
Children picking used tear gas cartridges after the weekly demonstration in Nabi Salih, August 2014

Bassem al-Tamimi, one of the leaders of the protests, has been arrested twelve times by Israeli forces, at one point spending more than three years in administrative detention without trial. His most recent arrest took place in March 2011, when he was charged with sending youths to throw stones, holding a march without a permit, incitement, and perverting the course of justice; an Israeli military court found him guilty of the former two charges and not guilty of the latter. His arrest drew international attention, with the European Union describing him as a "human rights defender", and Amnesty International designating him a prisoner of conscience.

=== Palestinians killed by Israeli forces in/from Nabi Salih ===
- On December 11, 2011, Mustafa Tamimi was shot and later died from his injury, becoming the first resident of Nabi Salih to be killed during a demonstration.
- On 19 November 2012, 28-year-old Rushdi Tamimi was killed by Israeli fire during a demonstration in Nabi Salih in solidarity with the people of the Gaza Strip in light of Israeli Operation Pillar of Cloud offensive. He was killed by Israeli reserve soldier, who had decided on their own to disperse a group of about ten demonstrating Palestinians. When their [rubber-coated] ammunition ran out, they continued shooting with their pistols, and a bullet hit Rushdi Tamimi. The company commander was removed from his position after this. He was the maternal uncle of Ahed Tamimi (younger brother of her mother).
- On 12 May 2017, 22 year old Sabaa ‘Obeid, (also: Saba Abu Ubeid), from Salfit, was shot dead in Nabih Saleh by an Israeli sniper.
- On 16 July 2017, a 34-year old suspect, believed to have been the gunman who targeted a vehicle near an Israeli settlement north of Ramallah and wounded a foreign national of Palestinian descent, was killed by Israeli soldiers after he attempted to fire upon them.
- On 6 June 2018, 21 years old Izz Abd al-Hafith Tamimi (also: Izzideen Tamimi) was shot dead by the Israelis, according to local sources at point-blank range, with three live bullets to the neck. Palestinian sources reported that he was being sought on suspicion of being a stone-thrower. The incident occurred during clashes that arose during an Israeli raid on the village. One Israeli army reports say he was shot by a soldier who had been wounded by a rock thrown by the youth, but according to the Twitter account of the Israeli army no Israeli soldier was injured.
- In July, 2021, 17 year old Mohammed Munir al-Tamimi from Nabi Salih was shot dead by Israeli forces in a demonstration at Beita.
- In February, 2022, 19 year old Nehad Amin Barghouti from Kafr Ein was shot dead by Israeli forces at the entrance of Nabi Saleh.
- In October, 2022, 19 years old Qusai Tamimi was killed by Israeli soldiers during protests against killing of 4 Palestinians in Nablus.
- In June, 2023, a 2 (or 3) year old boy, Mohammed al-Tamimi, was shot and killed, while his father was wounded while they were riding in a car. The Israeli forces first said they were caught in a cross-fire, while later they said they had been shot by Israeli fire.

=== Other security incidents ===
- On 16 January 2016 the Israeli army sealed the main road entering the village.

Nabi Salih was one of three main subjects of the 2016 book "The Way to the Spring: Life and Death in Palestine" by Ben Ehrenreich.

=== B'Tselem reports ===
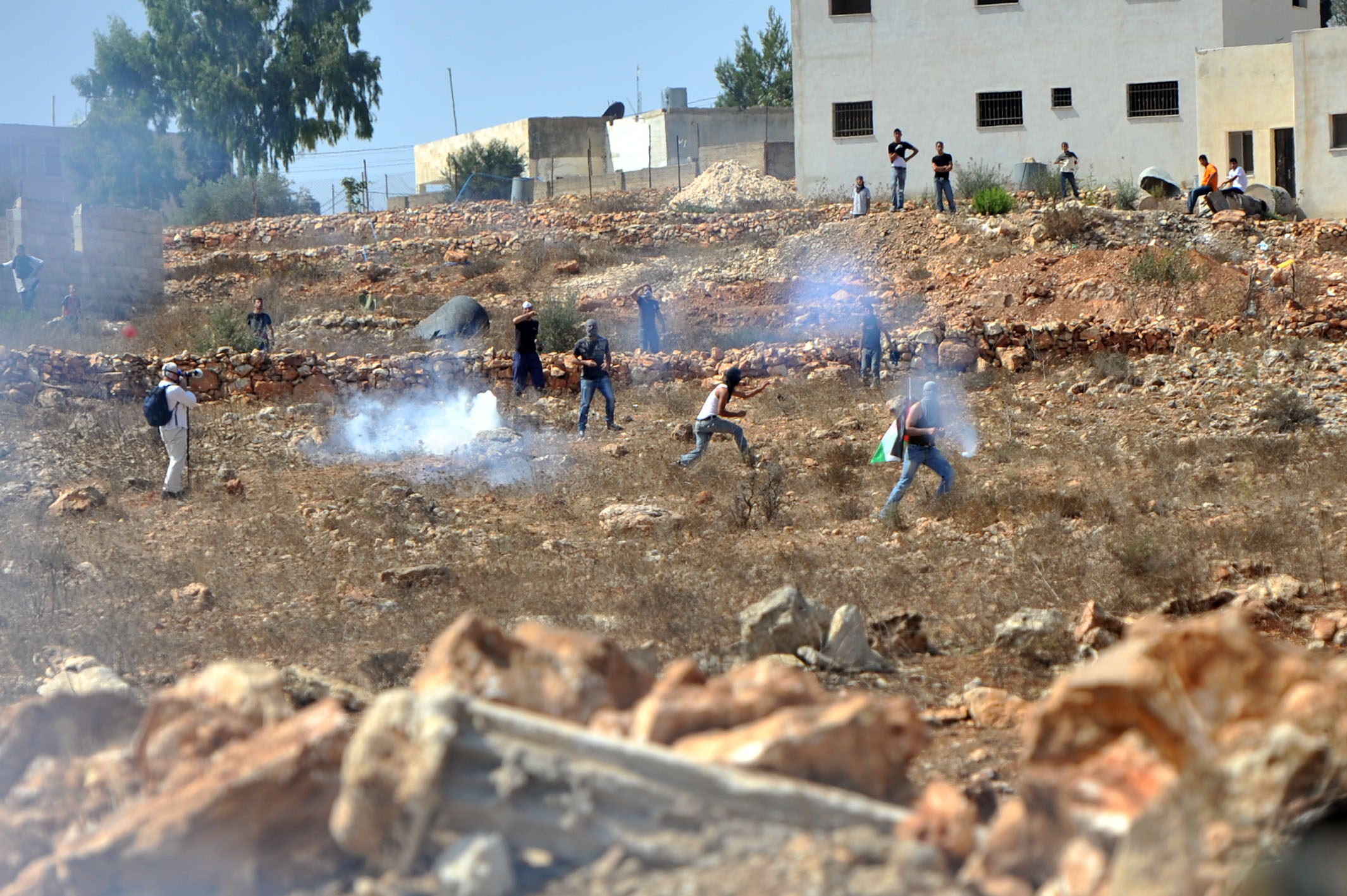
Palestinian protesters clashing with Israeli forces near Nabi Salih, 2011

In February 2011, B'Tselem volunteers filmed Israeli soldiers coming to the homes of Palestinian residents, waking and photographing children. A B'Tselem report released in September 2011 accused Israel's security forces of infringing the rights of the Palestinian demonstrators in Nabi Saleh.

On 31 August 2012 two demonstrators at the village were injured by bullets during a protest gathering. The IDF undertook to investigate and said that soldiers fired shots into the air in response to stone-throwing.

In 2016, the villagers decided to stop their protest marches. In the six years since 2010, the mayor estimated that 350 members out of a population of 600 had suffered injuries from various Israeli crowd dispersal measures, 50 of whom had been disabled.

== Geography ==
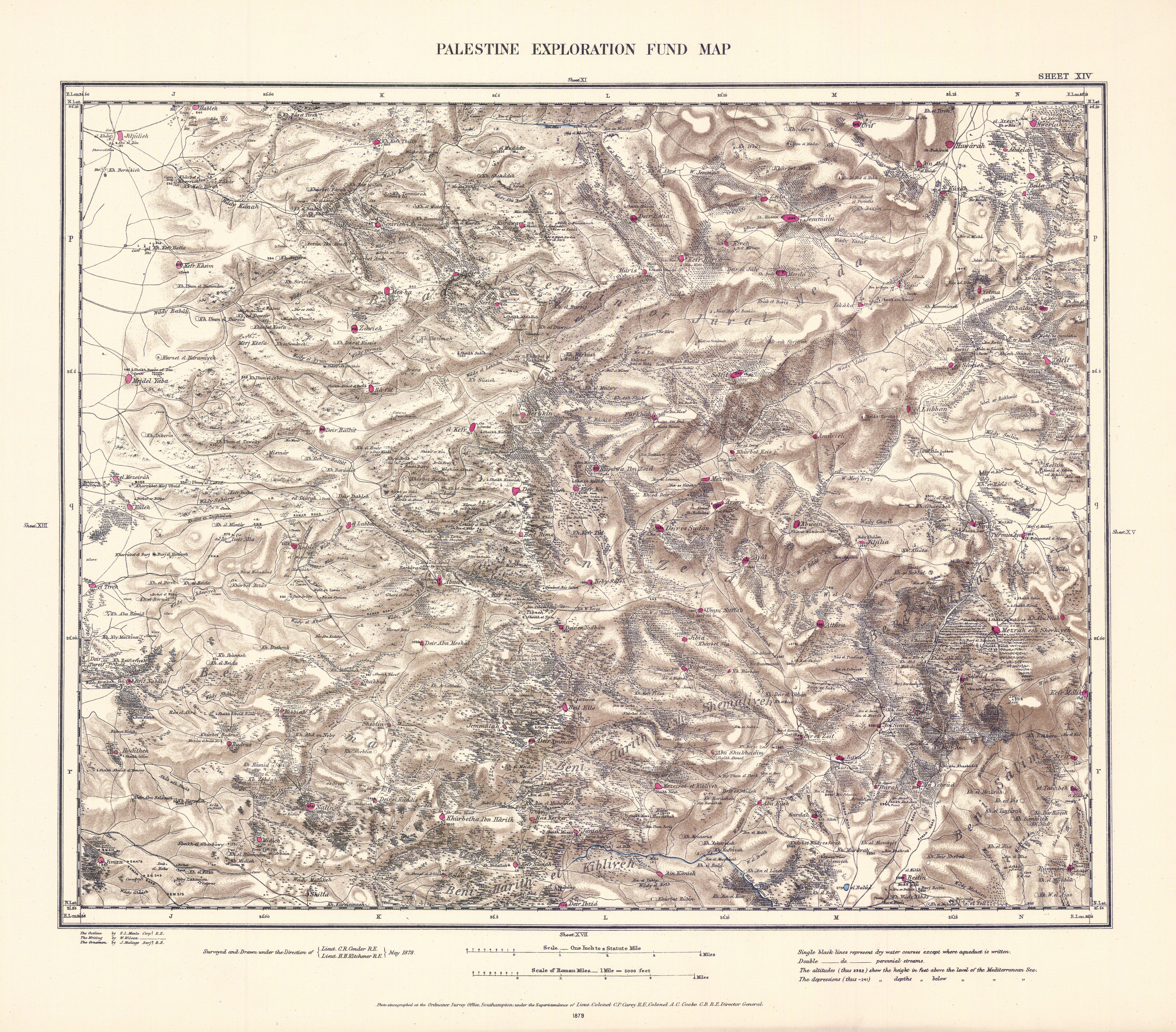
Beni Zeid, Deir en Nidham, Neby Saleh, Ain W. Reiya Survey of Western Palestine (1872–1877)

The village is located in the Raya Valley, at an elevation of 570 meters above sea level along the mountainous chain running down the West Bank. Nabi Salih is located 20 kilometers northwest the cities of Ramallah and al-Bireh. It is adjacent of the Beit Rima part of Bani Zeid in the northwest. Other nearby localities include Kafr Ein in the north, Deir as-Sudan to the northeast, 'Abud to the west, and Deir Nidham to the southwest.

In a 1945 land and population survey by Sami Hadawi, Nabi Salih had a total land area of 2,846 dunams, of which 2,797 was Arab-owned, the remainder public-owned. The built-up area of the village only constituted 11 dunams, while 735 dunams were planted with olive groves.

=== Important Bird Area ===
A largely forested 3,500 ha site in the vicinity of the villages of Nabi Salih and Umm Safa has been recognised as an Important Bird Area (IBA) by BirdLife International because it supports a population of lesser spotted eagles.

== Hydrology ==
There is a series of five natural springs in the Raya Valley that extends between Nabi Salih and the nearby village of Dir Nizam. Ein al Qaws is the largest of four natural springs in the Raya valley. The others are Ein Al Raya on the northwest of Highway 465, Ein al Qaws and Ein Khaled, side by side to the southeast of Highway 465 and Ein El Zama'a on Highway 50.

=== Ein al-Qaws Spring ===
Near the village there is a natural spring named Ein al-Qaws ("the Bow Spring") which is owned by an individual of the village, Bashir Tamimi. In 2009 settlers from the nearby illegal Israeli settlement of Halamish took control over the spring and its surroundings and prevented Palestinian access to their land. Subsequently, people of Nabi Salih and the nearby village of Dir Nizam began regular Friday protests for the spring, and against the Israeli occupation in general.

== Demographics ==
In the 1997 census by the Palestinian Central Bureau of Statistics (PCBS), Nabi Salih had a population of 371. Palestinian refugees constituted just 4.3% of the inhabitants. According to the PCBS, the village had a population of 524 inhabitants in mid-year 2006. The 2007 PCBS census recorded a population of 534.

== Notable residents ==
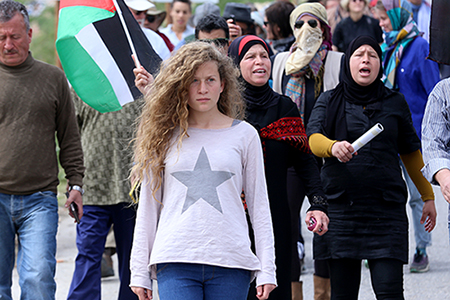
The teen activist Ahed Tamimi during a demonstration against Israeli occupation, March 2016

- Janna Jihad, Palestinian youth activist and amateur journalist
- Ahed Tamimi, teen activist for the Palestinian cause, arrested in December 2017 for slapping an Israeli soldier
- Ahlam Tamimi, accomplice in the Sbarro restaurant suicide bombing
- Bassem Tamimi, activist for the Palestinian cause

== See also ==
- Nabi Samwil
- Tegart fort. One housed the Nabi Salih police station, now serves as the Halamish day care center and girls high school

== Bibliography ==
- Barron, J.B., ed. (1923). Palestine: Report and General Abstracts of the Census of 1922. Government of Palestine.
- Büssow, J. (2011). Hamidian Palestine: Politics and Society in the District of Jerusalem 1872-1908. BRILL. ISBN 978-9004205697.
- Conder, C.R.; Kitchener, H.H. (1882). The Survey of Western Palestine: Memoirs of the Topography, Orography, Hydrography, and Archaeology. Vol. 2. London: Committee of the Palestine Exploration Fund.
- Finkelstein, I.; Lederman, Zvi, eds. (1997). Highlands of many cultures. Tel Aviv: Institute of Archaeology of Tel Aviv University Publications Section. ISBN 965-440-007-3.
- Government of Jordan, Department of Statistics (1964). First Census of Population and Housing. Volume I: Final Tables; General Characteristics of the Population (PDF).
- Government of Palestine, Department of Statistics (1945). Village Statistics, April, 1945.
- Guérin, V. (1875). Description Géographique Historique et Archéologique de la Palestine. Vol 2; Samarie, pt. 2. Paris, Imprimé par autorisation de l'empereur à l'Impr. impériale.
- Hadawi, S. (1970). Village Statistics of 1945: A Classification of Land and Area ownership in Palestine. Palestine Liberation Organization Research Center.
- Hartmann, M. (1883). "Die Ortschaftenliste des Liwa Jerusalem in dem türkischen Staatskalender für Syrien auf das Jahr 1288 der Flucht (1871)". Zeitschrift des Deutschen Palästina-Vereins. 6: 102–149.
- Hütteroth, W.-D.; Abdulfattah, K. (1977). Historical Geography of Palestine, Transjordan and Southern Syria in the Late 16th Century. Erlanger Geographische Arbeiten, Sonderband 5. Erlangen, Germany: Vorstand der Fränkischen Geographischen Gesellschaft. ISBN 3-920405-41-2.
- Mills, E., ed. (1932). Census of Palestine 1931. Population of Villages, Towns and Administrative Areas. Jerusalem: Government of Palestine.
- Palmer, E.H. (1881). The Survey of Western Palestine: Arabic and English Name Lists Collected During the Survey by Lieutenants Conder and Kitchener, R. E. Transliterated and Explained by E.H. Palmer. Committee of the Palestine Exploration Fund.
- Schick, C. (1896). "Zur Einwohnerzahl des Bezirks Jerusalem". Zeitschrift des Deutschen Palästina-Vereins. 19: 120–127.
- Socin, A. (1879). "Alphabetisches Verzeichniss von Ortschaften des Paschalik Jerusalem". Zeitschrift des Deutschen Palästina-Vereins. 2: 135–163.
