= Black Laundry =

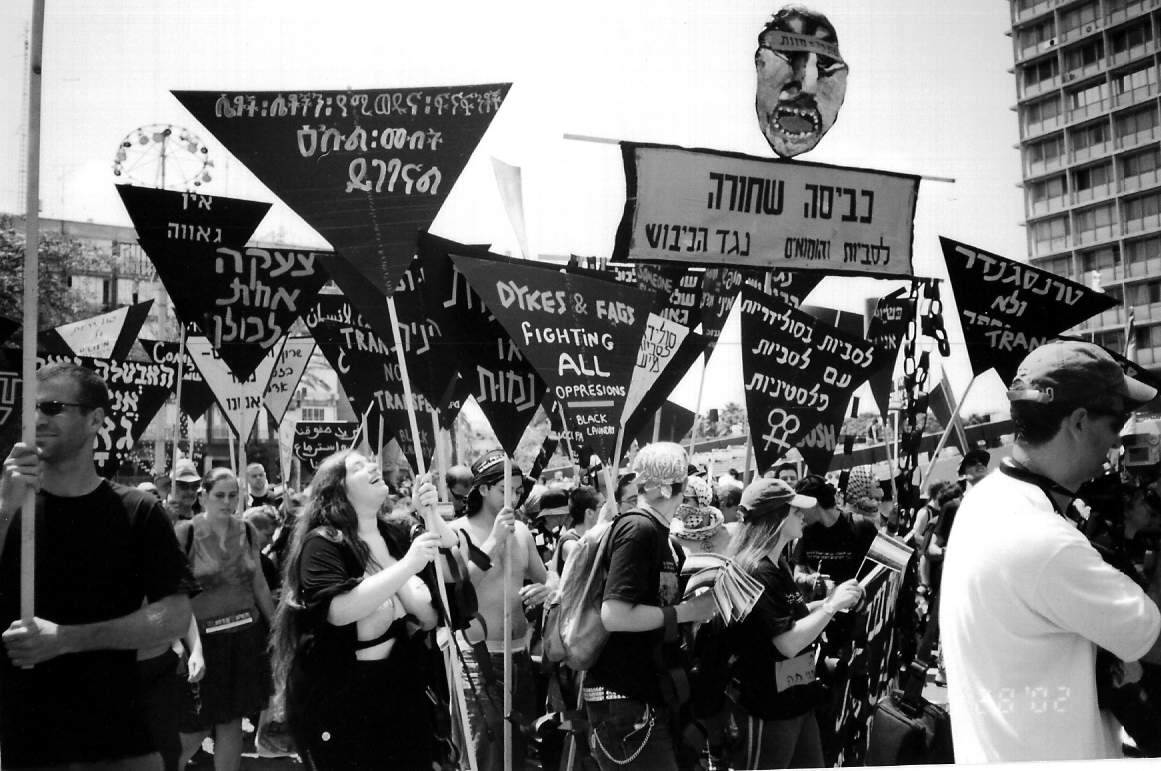
Black Laundry at the 2002 pride parade in Tel Aviv

Black Laundry (Hebrew: כביסה שחורה, romanized: Kvisa Shchora) was a lesbian, gay, bisexual, transgender, and queer (LGBTQ) organization that used direct action to oppose Israeli occupation of Palestinian land and advocated for social justice. The group made its first public appearance in 2001 after the second Intifada, where 250 members marched in the Tel Aviv Pride Day parade with the message "No Pride in Occupation".

Co-founder Dalit Baum, an activist and professor at the Community School for Women, created Black Laundry to focus on creating a community that advocates social justice for women and queer community by using feminist theory and working with both Palestinians and Israelis.

According to their website, "Black Laundry tries to stress the connection between different forms of oppression – our own oppression as lesbians, gays and transpeople enhances our solidarity with members of other oppressed groups."

== See also ==
- International Solidarity Movement
- Israeli–Palestinian conflict
- Refuseniks in Israel
- LGBT pinkwashing in Israel
