= Bassem Tamimi =

Palestinian activist (born 1967)

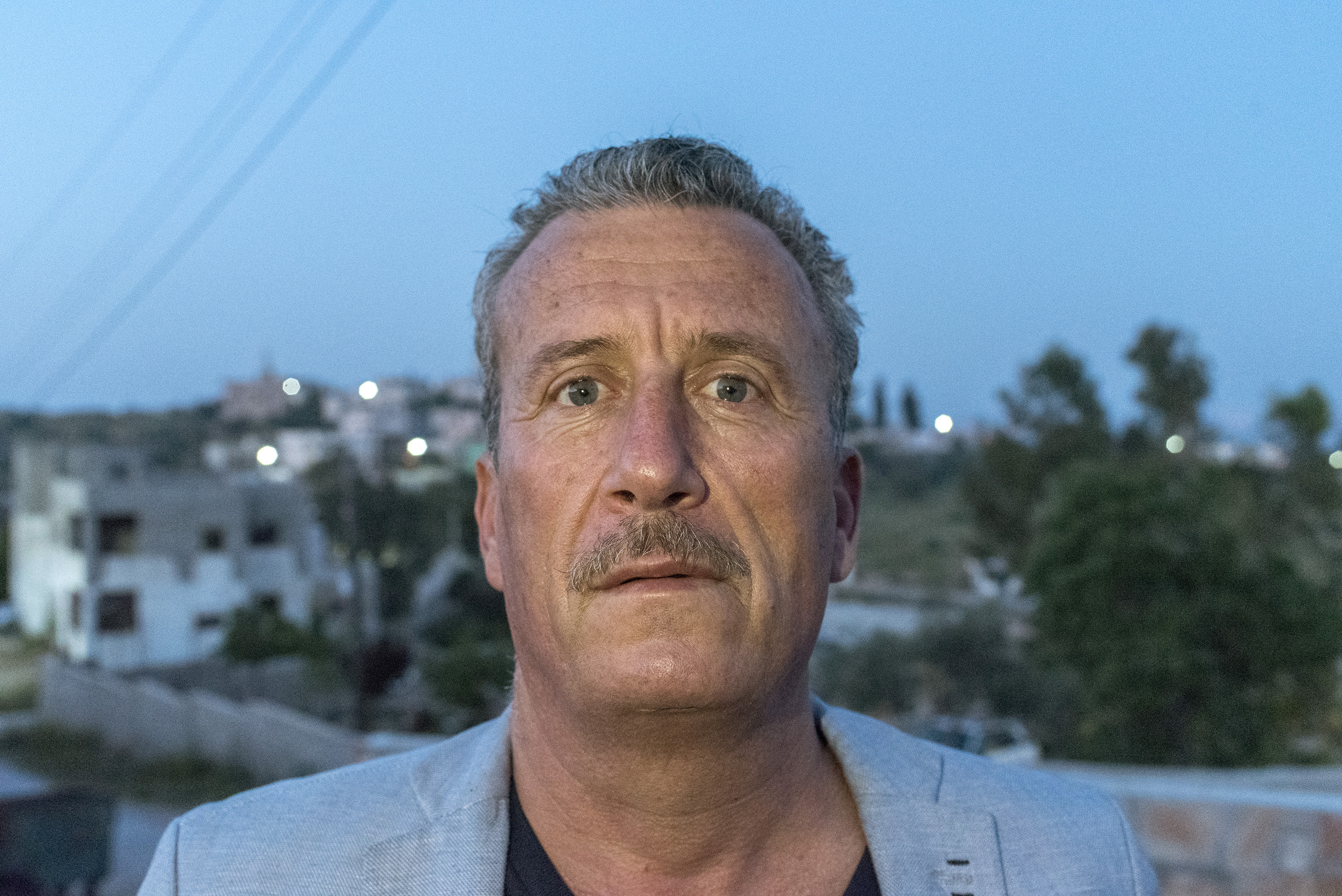
- Born: c. 1967 (age 58–59)
- Known for: Grassroots activism; 2012 conviction for sending stone-throwers and protesting illegally; recognition by Amnesty International and the European Union
- Spouse: Nariman Tamimi
- Children: 4, including Ahed Tamimi

Bassem Tamimi (also Bassem al-Tamimi; Arabic: باسم التميمي; born c. 1967) is a Palestinian grassroots activist and an organizer of protests against Israeli settlement construction in the West Bank. He was convicted by an Israeli military court in 2012 (after being arrested in 2011) for "sending people to throw stones, and holding a march without a permit".

In his West Bank village Nabi Salih, Tamimi organizes weekly demonstrations against Israeli settlement. He has been arrested by the Israeli authorities over a dozen times, at one point spending more than three years in administrative detention without trial. Tamimi has said that he advocates grassroots, nonviolent resistance, but has also said that stone-throwing is an important symbol of Palestinian resistance to Israeli occupation. His 2011 arrest drew international attention, with the European Union describing him as a human rights defender, and Amnesty International designating him a prisoner of conscience. He was arrested again in October 2012 for a demonstration in a supermarket, but released in early 2013. Three weeks after the outbreak of the Gaza war, on 29 October 2023, Tamimi was again placed under administrative detention. On expiry of the term in April 2024, he was again remanded for detention for a further six months.

He is the father of Ahed Tamimi, who was sentenced to eight months in prison under a plea bargain in 2018.

== Activism ==
=== Background ===
Tamimi was ten weeks old at the time of the Israeli occupation of the West Bank in June 1967 and hid with his mother in a cave during the conflict. As a grassroots activist, he organized weekly demonstrations to protest the seizure of the village's well by the nearby Israeli settlement of Halamish, established in 1977. The protests regularly lead to violent clashes, with Palestinian youths throwing stones and Israeli forces firing on protesters with tear gas, rubber bullets, and water cannons. Since the end of 2009, 64 people (13% of the village's population) has been arrested.

Prior to his 2011 arrest, Tamimi had been arrested by Israeli authorities eleven times, at one point spending more than three years in administrative detention without trial. In 1993, he was in a coma for eight days after being tortured during an interrogation, and required surgery for removal of a subdural haematoma. His home has also been designated for demolition by Israel's Civil Administration. (Note: +972 Magazine, Oren Ziv, February 19, 2020; "In 1993, he was tortured during an interrogation and spent several days in a coma.")

Tamimi is an admirer of Indian independence leader Mahatma Gandhi and believes that armed conflict against a more powerful Israeli opponent will only bring disaster. Tamimi states that he advocates nonviolent resistance, telling a reporter in 2011, "Our strategic choice of a popular struggle—as a means to fight the occupation taking over our lands, lives and future—is a declaration that we do not harm human lives. The very essence of our activity opposes killing." However, he has stated he is not concerned as to whether stone-throwing is a form of violence, but views it instead as a symbol of Palestinian resistance: "We see our stones as our message."

=== March 2011 arrest and trial ===
On 24 March 2011 Tamimi was detained by Israeli forces following a demonstration. Following his arrest, he was charged with sending youths to throw stones, holding a march without a permit, incitement, and perverting the course of justice. He was subsequently held in a military prison for thirteen months. Amnesty International designated him a prisoner of conscience, "detained solely for his role in organizing peaceful protests against the encroachment onto Palestinian lands by Israeli settlers," and called for his immediate and unconditional release.

On 27 April 2012 Tamimi was released on 12,000 shekels (US$3,193) bail due to a stroke suffered by his mother two weeks previous. An army prosecutor protested against his release, stating that Tamimi would "most definitely continue to use the status he received because of his arrest to influence young people to throw stones."

Tamimi, during his trial, repeatedly questioned the legitimacy of the Israeli military court trying him as well as Israeli regulations regarding public gatherings. The military judge ultimately found him guilty of sending stone-throwers and illegal protesting but cleared him of the two more serious charges. She stated that testimony from a 14-year-old witness had been inconsistent and therefore unusable and that she had found misrepresentations by interrogators about the content of the confession of another witness. Israeli activist Jonathan Pollak described Tamimi's partial exoneration as a "miracle" given the 99.74 percent conviction rate of the military court. Before his sentencing Tamimi stated that "the laws come from an occupying regime whose legitimacy I do not recognise. I don't think even for a single minute that there is going to be justice done." His lawyer denied Tamimi's involvement in stone throwing, stating that Tamimi believed in passive resistance.

On 29 May, Tamimi was sentenced to time served of thirteen months' imprisonment, and an additional two suspended sentences. A military spokeswoman stated that the sentence had been suspended due to "irregularities in the trial" and Tamimi's "clean prison record". Under the terms of Tamimi's suspended sentences, he would be imprisoned for two months if he participated in an illegal demonstration within two years of the sentencing, and imprisoned for seven months if he participated in "activity against the security forces" within five years. Responding to the suspended sentences, Tamimi said, "I feel that my whole life is under the surveillance of the judge."

Catherine Ashton, the European Union High Representative of the Union for Foreign Affairs and Security Policy, expressed the EU's concern over the conviction and called on Israel to allow peaceful protests. She also condemned the interrogation of a minor without a lawyer in the investigation as a "violation of his rights." Human Rights Watch stated that the conviction "violates [Tamimi's] right to freedom of assembly, while [the court's] conviction of him on a second charge of urging children to throw stones on the basis of a child’s coercively-obtained statement raises serious concerns about the fairness of his trial."

=== October 2012 arrest ===
On 24 October, Tamimi joined 80 other activists, both Palestinian and international, in a protest at a Rami Levy supermarket in the West Bank just north of Jerusalem. The activists carried banners reading "Boycott occupation and its products." Tamimi was arrested during the protest, which the Israeli police called "an illegal demonstration." Amnesty International again described him as a prisoner of conscience, stating "Once again, Bassem Tamimi is being held solely for peacefully exercising his rights to freedom of expression and assembly." He was released in early 2013.

On 2 November, his sixteen-year-old son Wa'ed Tamimi was also arrested during one of the weekly demonstrations in Nabi Salih. The charges against him were dismissed by a judge two weeks later.

=== 2013–present ===
In a February 2013 interview with Haaretz, Tamimi said he supported a binational one-state solution:

Israel has killed the two-state solution. That is why we must adopt a new strategy, and find a new partner for that strategy in Israeli society. We must kill the occupation and the [sense of] separation in the Israeli consciousness: The separation of people from one another is a question of consciousness. We must never return to this failed pattern of thinking. The future will not change if we continue to think with the same concepts of the past. The solution is a single state. If we believe we have a right to this land and the Israelis believe they are the ones who have a right to this land, we must build a new model. If both of us believe that God gave us this land, we must put history aside and begin to think about the future in different terms.

In 2015, the Anti-Defamation League condemned a post (since deleted) by Tamimi on social media, where he allegedly spread the false myth of the Israel harvesting the organs of Palestinian children.

In December 2017, Tamimi's 16-year-old daughter, Ahed Tamimi, was seen in a viral video, pushing, punching and kicking Israeli soldiers, following their cousin being shot in the face with a rubber bullet and being put into an induced coma. The next day, she was arrested for the first time by the Israeli army, in a pre-dawn raid on their home in Nabi Salih. Later in the day, Ahad's mother Nariman was allegedly arrested too when visiting her daughter at a police station. In the wake of the incident, Israeli Education Minister Naftali Bennett declared that the young women involved "should finish their lives in prison".

On the 29 October 2023, while travelling to visit relatives in Jordan, Tamimi was detained at Allenby Bridge and last heard of when the family was telephoned by an anonymous woman from Silwan from Hadassah hospital where he had been taken after suffering from a dangerous rise in blood pressure. His voice can be heard reassuring the family that he was all right. Some time later, the woman sent a photo of him bound in ziptie cuffs as he underwent his checkup. The family learnt he had been sentenced to 6 months of administration detention in early November.

He was permitted a visit from his lawyer shortly before Eid al-Fitr in April 2024. On the expiry of his first detention, the sentence was renewed under secret hearings. A friend who suffered the same fate was released and enabled Tamimi's lawyer to ascertain some elements surrounding the circumstances and reasons for his incarceration. When Haaretz attempted to publish what it called ‘the Kafkaesque proceedings of judicial review’, the Israeli military censor blacked out a large part of their report. Tamimi is one of 7016 Palestinians, as of 29 May 2024, held in detention by Israel without any conviction, of whom 60% are being held without charges being laid or a trial leading to conviction.

== Personal life ==
Tamimi has a wife, Nariman, and four children. The Tamimis say they were a Christian family, who became Muslim before they came to Nabi Salih (from Hebron) 300–400 years ago. In 2012, a photograph of his daughter Ahed shaking her fist at an Israeli soldier became internationally famous, and she received the Handala Courage award in Istanbul, meeting Turkey's then prime minister, Recep Tayyip Erdogan.

In 1993, Tamimi's sister Bassama Tamimi died while attending his remand hearing at the military court in Ramallah, allegedly after she was pushed down a flight of stairs by an Israeli army interpreter. Bassem's cousin Rushdi Muhammed Sa'id Tamimi was convicted of the October 1993 murder of Haim Mizrahi, a settler from Beit El, and was released in 2013. Bassem was arrested and reportedly tortured. In December 2011, Tamimi's cousin Mustafa Tamimi was killed by a direct hit from a gas grenade fired at close range. In November 2012, Tamimi's brother-in-law Rushdi Tamimi was shot and killed by Israeli soldiers.
