= Killing of Eyad al-Hallaq =

Shooting of autistic Palestinian by Israeli police

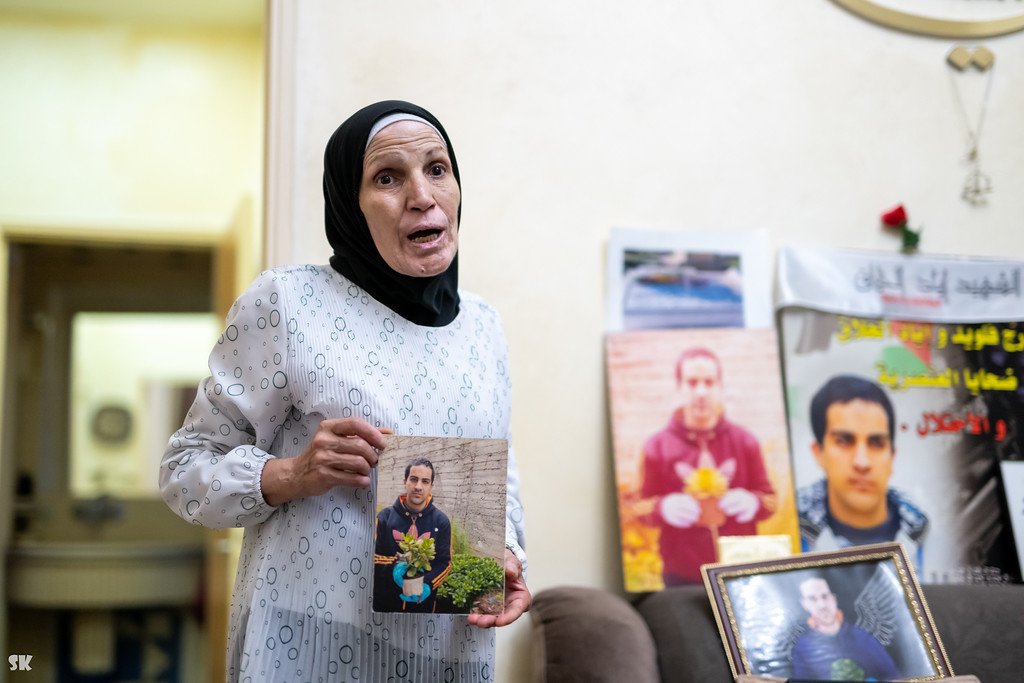
Eyad al-Hallaq's mother with his pictures

On 30 May 2020, Eyad al-Hallaq (Note: News sources have spelled his last name as Halaq and Halak, and his first name as Iyad.) (Arabic: إياد الحلاق, romanized: ’Iyād al-Ḥallāq), a 32-year-old unarmed autistic Palestinian man, was shot and killed by the Israel Border Police in East Jerusalem of the Israeli-occupied West Bank.

Hallaq was heading to a school for students with special needs, and passed through the Lions' Gate checkpoint, where Israeli police officers attempted to stop him and shot at least seven times in his direction. Hallaq fled from the area and hid in a garbage shed nearby, where he was then shot dead by an Israeli officer. The officer later claimed that he thought Hallaq was attempting to murder a screaming woman. The woman in question was his school councilor.

On 6 July 2023, an Israeli court acquitted the officer of charges of "reckless homicide" based on his argument that he fired in self-defense and believed Hallaq was attempting an attack. At the court, Hallaq's parents expressed their dismay and shock. His father said the ruling was a "disgrace," and that there is "one justice [system] for Jews and another for Arabs." The court's decision drew Palestinian outrage and focused attention on treatment of Palestinians by Israeli police. The following day, Hallaq's crying mother confronted a group of Israeli demonstrators, including far-right National Security Minister Itamar Ben Gvir, who called her a terrorist.

The minister and other Israeli police officials expressed their support for the officer. Ben Gvir had been campaigning on loosening open-fire rules and shielding security personnel from criminal prosecution. An Israeli state comptroller report found that only 1.2% of complaints against officers in 2021 resulted in indictments.

Friends and family of Halaq and the Secretary General of the Palestine Liberation Organization, Saab Erekat, have drawn parallels with police brutality in the United States and the murder of George Floyd.

== Incident ==
Halaq and his teacher were walking on 30 May 2020 to the Elwyn El Quds center which provides services for children and adults with disabilities when they approached the Lions' Gate checkpoint. The checkpoint was part of the daily walk from Halaq's home in East Jerusalem's Wadi al-Joz area to the special-needs center in the Old City, which he had attended since 2014. When he reportedly stepped through the arches of the Gate, Israel Border Police officers on duty became suspicious when he placed his hand into his pocket for his cell phone. He had apparently not understood the shouted commands from the officers to halt, but fled on foot and hid in a garbage room. His father told reporters that the teacher attempted to tell police that Halaq was disabled and to check his identity, but officers maintained a distance and opened fire.

In a statement the Israeli police claimed that Halaq was believed to be carrying a weapon after officers spotted an object that looked like a pistol. When he failed to obey their calls to halt, officers gave chase. A local television station reported that he was chased into a dead-end alley, and a senior officer orders a halt in fire after entering the alley. A second officer reportedly ignored orders and fired about six or seven shots from a M16 rifle which killed Halaq. He was found to not be in possession of a weapon when he was searched after his death.

== Investigation ==
Following protocol, the officers involved in the shooting were questioned afterwards, and one issued a statement of condolences to Halaq's family through his lawyer in an interview with Israeli Army Radio. Reportedly the officer who continued to fire was a new recruit and his lawyer has argued that he thought he was in real danger. Relatives of Halaq have demanded any footage of the killing and chase be used in the investigation and for the family to be able to view it, as the Old City is covered extensively by security cameras. Hallaq's parents have petitioned the High Court of Justice to conclude the investigation of the case and put the two police officers involved on trial. On 21 October 2020 Israeli prosecutors recommended that the police officer who shot and killed al-Hallaq be charged with manslaughter.

The Israel Police Internal Investigations Department opened an investigation into the incident. In October 2020, the Israeli Justice Ministry announced that the shooter would be charged with reckless manslaughter pending a hearing to dispute the charges. On 6 July 2023, an Israeli court acquitted the officer of charges of "reckless homicide" based on his argument that he fired in self-defense and believed Hallaq was attempting an attack. At the court, Hallaq's parents expressed their dismay and shock. His father said the ruling was a "disgrace," and that there is "one justice [system] for Jews and another for Arabs." The court's decision drew Palestinian outrage and focused attention on treatment of Palestinians by Israeli police. The following day, Hallaq's crying mother confronted a group of Israeli demonstrators, including far-right National Security Minister Itamar Ben Gvir, who called her a terrorist.

== Aftermath ==
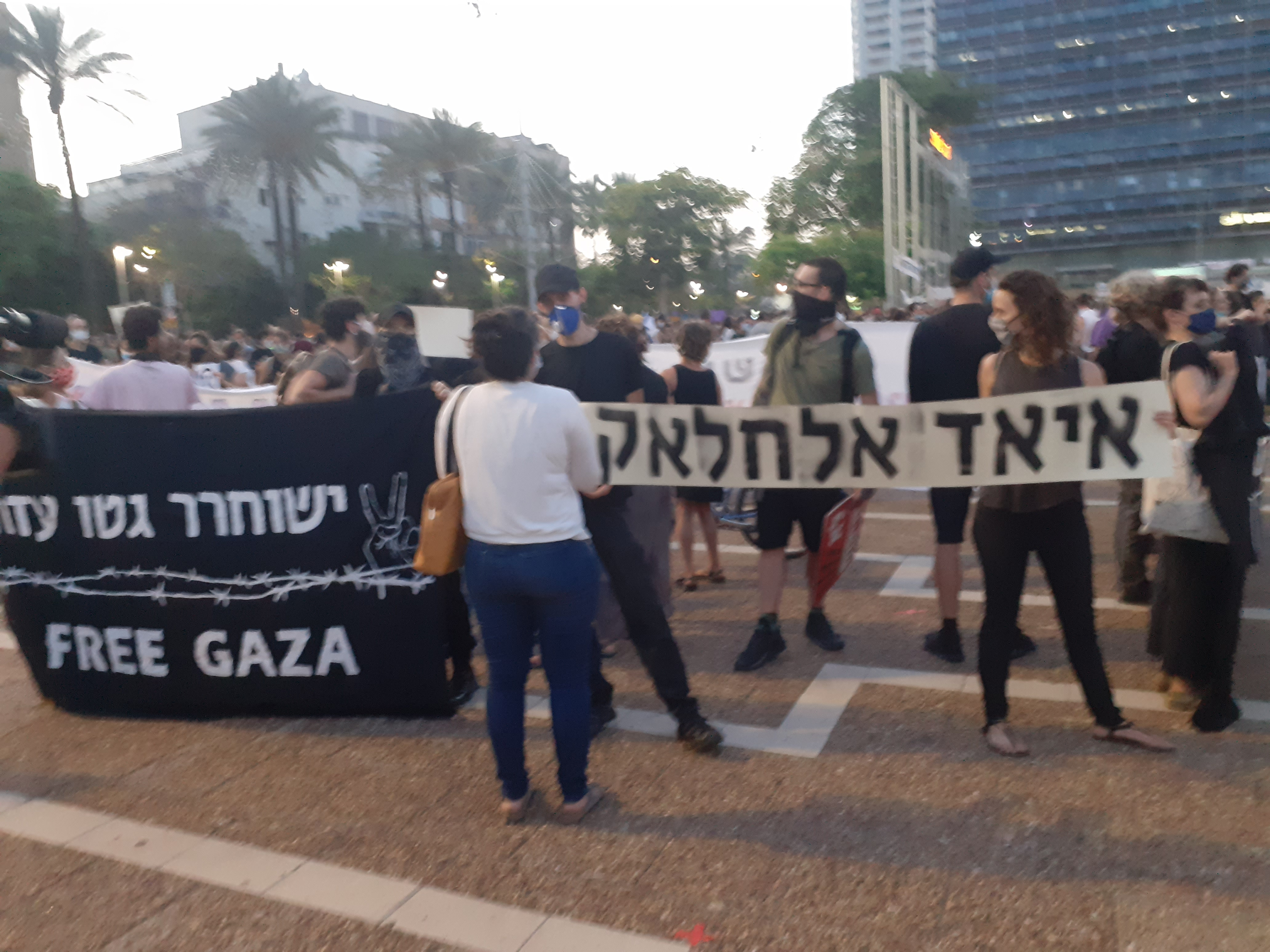
A sign in memory of Eyad al-Hallaq in a demonstration in Rabin Square, Tel Aviv against the annexation of the West Bank, 6 June 2020

A protest was staged in front of the Church of the Nativity in Bethlehem on 2 June, against police brutality, the murder of George Floyd, and the death of Halaq, following similar protests in Jerusalem and Tel Aviv on 30 May. Others used social media to protest with the hashtag #PalestinianLivesMatter while over a thousand mourners attended his funeral. According to the United States Commission on International Religious Freedom, during the funeral hundreds of mourners reportedly chanted "Khaybar Khaybar ya yahud," referencing the seventh-century Battle of Khaybar in which Muslims led by Muhammad won over the Jews of the Khaybar oasis, in present-day Saudi Arabia.

== Reactions ==
Halaq's sister Diana told reporters that the police officer who shot her brother should be imprisoned but that she believed the officer would remain unpunished as her family were Palestinian. The leader of the main Arab party in Parliament, Ayman Odeh, echoed concerns about the lack of punishment for the officers, using Twitter to post concerns about an "expected cover-up" and that justice would only be done when the "Palestinian people know freedom and independence".

Benny Gantz, the Alternate Prime Minister of Israel, discussed the issue at a weekly meeting of the Israeli cabinet the next day, stating the government was sorry about the incident and shared in the families grief while calling for a swift investigation. Benjamin Netanyahu was also in attendance and did not comment on the incident. Palestinian President Mahmoud Abbas called the killing a "war crime" and Hamas issued warnings of a new intifada.

The United Nations' Office of the High Commissioner for Human Rights called the killing another case of "the routine use of lethal force by Israeli Security forces against Palestinians in Gaza and in the West Bank, including East Jerusalem". The statement continued by stressing the need for the least force possible to be used in any situation. It has also charged Israel with not being transparent about the rules of engagement, that were against international law regulations.

On 7 June 2020, Prime Minister Benjamin Netanyahu expressed his condolences and said that he "expected a full investigation into the matter." He also said the incident was a "tragedy."

== See also ==
- Extrajudicial killing
- Killing of David Ben Avraham
- List of violent incidents in the Israeli–Palestinian conflict, 2020
- Death of Mohammad Habali
