= Naseer Aruri =

Palestinian-American professor and author (1934–2015)

Naseer H. Aruri
- نصير عاروري
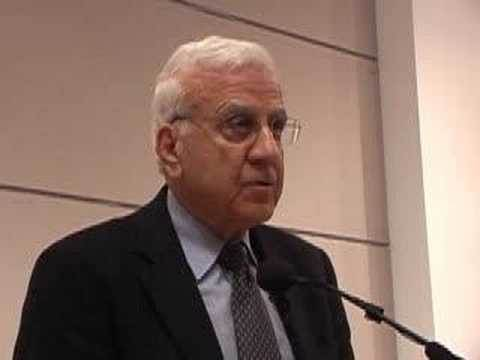
- Born: January 7, 1934; Jerusalem, Mandatory Palestine
- Died: February 10, 2015 (aged 81)
- Occupations: Scholar-activist, Expert on Middle East politics, U.S. foreign policy, Human rights
- Known for: Expert on Middle East politics and human rights
- Spouse: Joyce Thomas
- Awards: College of Arts and Sciences “Distinguished Research Award” (1993)

Academic background
- Education: B.A. in History from American International College, Ph.D. from University of Massachusetts Amherst

Academic work
- Institutions: University of Massachusetts-Dartmouth
- Notable works: The Palestinian Resistance to Israeli Occupation, The Obstruction of Peace, Dishonest Broker

Naseer H. Aruri (Arabic: نصير عاروري, 7 January 1934 – 10 February 2015) was a Palestinian-American scholar-activist and expert on Middle East politics, U.S. foreign policy in the Middle East and human rights. Aruri was Chancellor Professor (Emeritus) of Political Science, having served on the faculty of the University of Massachusetts-Dartmouth from 1965-1998. In 1993, he was the recipient of the College of Arts and Sciences “Distinguished Research Award”. Aruri’s papers have been preserved and are on display at the Claire T. Carney Library Archives and Special Collections at UMASS-Dartmouth.

== Early life ==
He was born in Jerusalem, Mandatory Palestine in 1934. His father was a high school principal in Jerusalem and he and his family split their time between Jerusalem and the West Bank village of Burham, where the family home still stands. Aruri emigrated to the United States in 1954 in order to pursue a college education. He arrived in Springfield, Massachusetts, where his brother, Said, was already a student at the American International College (AIC). He received his B.A. in History from AIC and his Ph.D. in political science from the University of Massachusetts Amherst. While a student at AIC, he was "adopted" by the sizeable Lebanese community of Springfield and later married Joyce Thomas, the daughter of a Lebanese immigrant. The couple eventually settled in the Town of Dartmouth, Massachusetts.

== Career ==
Aruri was elected to three consecutive terms as a member of the board of directors of Amnesty International, USA (1984-1990). He was also a member of the board of directors of the New York-based Human Rights Watch/Middle East, 1990-1992. Aruri was a founding member of the Arab Organization for Human Rights (AOHR), Cairo and Geneva in 1982 and a member of the editorial board of Third World Quarterly (London). He was a participant in the drafting of the Arab Covenant of Human Rights under the auspices of the International Institute of Higher Studies in Criminal Justice, in Siracusa, Italy in December 1986. He was a member of the Independent Palestinian Commission for the Protection of Citizens Rights (Ramallah) since its inception in January 1994, and a member of the advisory board of directors of the International Institute for Criminal Investigations in The Hague. Aruri spoke at the United Nations and delivered the Keynote address on the occasion of the 40th Anniversary of the Universal Declaration on Human Rights at the invitation of the United Nations Staff Union – U.N. Headquarters, New York, on December 9, 1988.

Aruri was a former member of the Palestinian National Council, the parliament-in-exile of the Palestinian people and served on the Central Council of the Palestine Liberation Organization. He was a founding member and twice served as President of the Association of Arab-American University Graduates (AAUG). He was also a founding member and former Chair of the Board of Directors of the Trans-Arab Research Institute and a member of the Board of Directors of the Jerusalem Fund and its Palestine Center Committee.

Aruri spoke at universities and scholarly conferences and appeared as a guest on media outlets, including PBS NewsHour, CNN Crossfire, CNN Lou Dobbs Tonight (Moneyline), ABC News, C-SPAN, Al Jazeera and has been a commentator on NPR, Pacifica Radio, the BBC, Radio Monte Carlo, the Voice of America and Alternative Radio.

Aruri has published widely in newspapers, magazines and scholarly journals throughout the Globe. He was the author/editor of books, chiefly on the subject of American foreign policy toward the Israeli-Palestinian conflict. Aruri’s publications include The Palestinian Resistance to Israeli Occupation (AAUG Press 1970), Enemy of the Sun: Poems of Palestinian Resistance, with Edmund Ghareeb (Drum and Spear Press 1970); Occupation: Israel Over Palestine (AAUG Press, 1983/ZED Press 1985; 2nd Edition, 1989) (chosen by the American Library Association’s Choice Magazine as an “Outstanding Academic Book for 1984/1985”); The Obstruction of Peace: The U.S., Israel and the Palestinians (Common Courage Press, 1995), Palestinian Refugees: The Right of Return (Pluto, 2001). "Revising Culture, Reinventing Peace: The Influence of Edward W. Said" with Muhammad Shuraydi (Interlink, 2001). His book Dishonest Broker: the U.S. Role in Israel and Palestine, (South End Press 2003) has also been translated into Arabic, Spanish and Italian. He was the co-author (with Samih Farsoun) of Palestine and the Palestinians: A Social and Political History. Second Edition, Westview Press (2006).

He was a harsh critic of the Oslo Peace Accords in what he suggested, at the time, amounted to a surrendering of the internationally recognized rights of the Palestinian people. He has been especially vocal in his criticism of the PLO, and later the Palestine Authority (PA), for its complicity in a process that he has described as providing the framework and cover for further Israeli colonization of Palestinian land.

== Personal life ==
Aruri and his wife Joyce (Thomas) married in 1961. They have four children and thirteen grandchildren. Aruri died of complications from Parkinson's disease on 10 February 2015, aged 81.

== Publications ==
- The Palestinian Resistance to Israeli Occupation (1970)
- Enemy of the Sun: Poems of Palestinian Resistance, with Edmund Ghareeb (1970)
- Jordan: A Study in Political Development 1923–1965. The Hague: Martinus Nijhoff Publishers. 1972. ISBN 978-90-247-1217-5.
- Occupation: Israel Over Palestine (Editor) (1983)
- The Obstruction of Peace: The U.S., Israel, and the Palestinians (1995)
- Revising Culture, Reinventing Peace: The Influence of Edward W. Said (Co-editor) (Interlink, 2001)
- Palestinian Refugees: The Right of Return (Editor) (Pluto Press, 2001)
- Dishonest Broker: America's Role in Israel and Palestine (South End Press, 2003)
- Palestine and the Palestinians: A Social and Political History, (2nd Edition) (with Samih Farsoun) (Westview Press, 2006)
- Bitter Legacy: The United States in the Middle East. (Haymarket Books May 2014)
- Israel's sacred terrorism by Livia Rokach (Preface: Naseer H. Aruri) (AAUG Press c1980, 1982, 1986)
