= Places of Mind =

2021 book by Timothy Brennan

Places of Mind: A Life of Edward Said
- Author: Timothy Brennan
- Language: English
- Subject: Edward Said
- Publisher: Farrar, Straus and Giroux
- Publication date: March 23, 2021
- Pages: 464
- ISBN: 978-0-374-14653-5

Places of Mind: A Life of Edward Said is a 2021 book by Timothy Brennan that examines the life of Edward Said.

The book has been reviewed in Bookforum, The New Yorker, and in The New York Times Book Review.
