= Michael Hudson (political scientist) =

American political scientist (1938–2021)

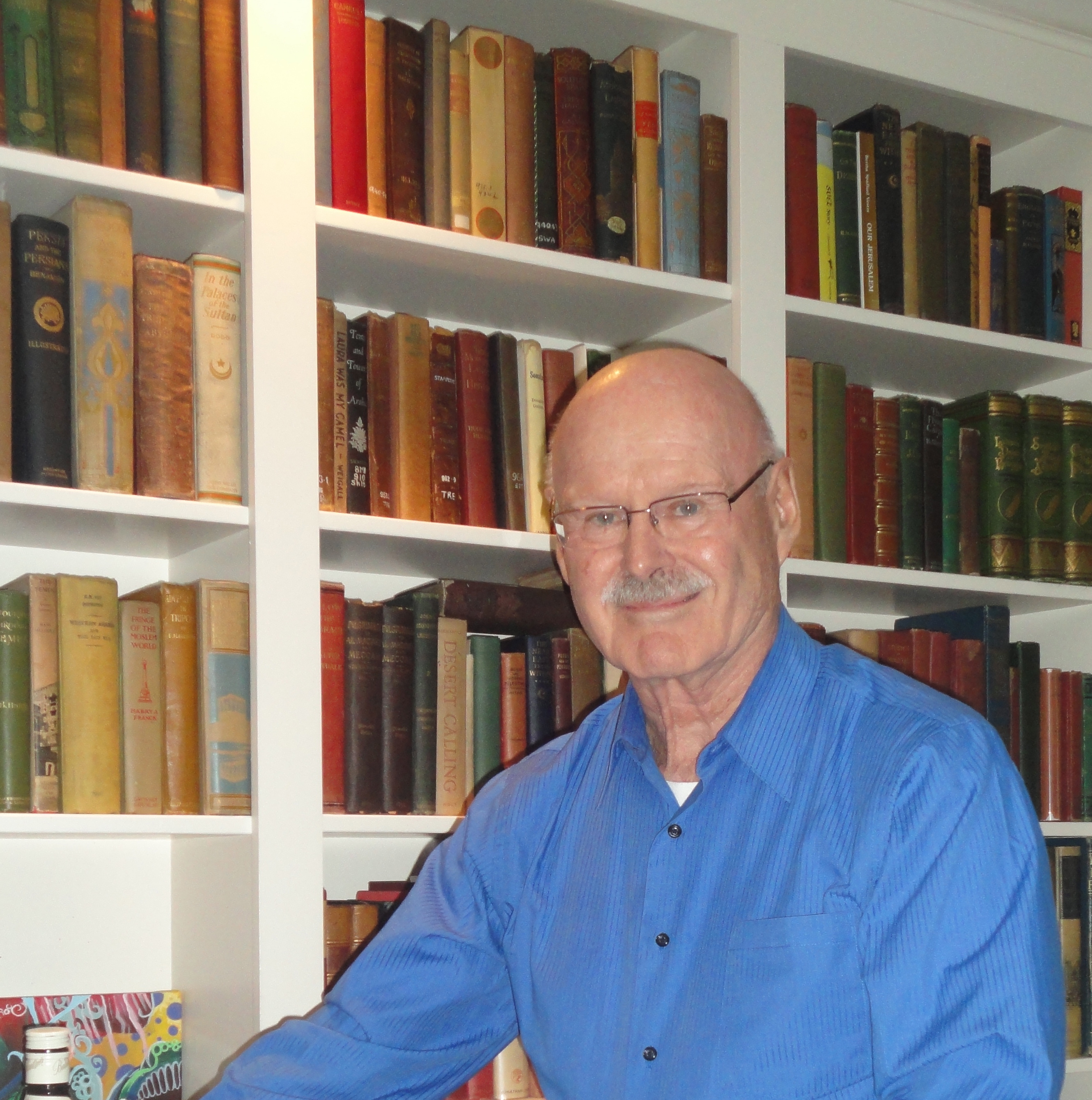
Professor Michael C. Hudson

Michael Craig Hudson (June 2, 1938 – May 25, 2021) was an American political scientist, the director of the Middle East Institute and professor of political science at the National University of Singapore. He was also professor emeritus at Georgetown University, where he was professor of international relations since 1979 and Saif Ghobash Professor of Arab Studies since 1980 in the Edmund A. Walsh School of Foreign Service. While at Georgetown, Hudson served as director of the Center for Contemporary Arab Studies intermittently for over twenty years, most recently from 2007 to 2010.

== Education ==
Michael C. Hudson received his Bachelor of Arts from Swarthmore College in 1959 and his Master of Arts and Ph.D. in political science from Yale University in 1960 and 1964, respectively. In 1961, he received a Certificate in Arabic from Princeton University. While studying for his PhD at Yale, Hudson specialized in comparative politics and international relations with his advisor, the renowned political scientist Karl W. Deutsch. His dissertation was entitled "Political Change in Lebanon: 1943-1963," which would be the basis for his first book The Precarious Republic: Political Modernization in Lebanon.

== Career ==
While conducting fieldwork in Lebanon for his doctoral dissertation, Hudson taught history at the American Community School in Beirut from 1962-1963. Also while completing his doctoral degree, he served as an instructor at Swarthmore College, from 1963-1964. Upon completing his studies at Yale University, Hudson became Assistant Professor at Brooklyn College at the City University of New York, from 1964-1968, and then an Associate Professor (tenured), from 1968-1970. In 1970, he became Associate Professor in the School of Advanced International Studies (SAIS) at the Johns Hopkins University. He remained at SAIS until 1975, when he co-founded the Center for Contemporary Arab Studies (CCAS) at Georgetown University with a distinguished group of academics, including Hisham Sharabi, John Ruedy, Ibrahim Oweiss, Ambassador Clovis Maksoud, and Dean Peter F. Krogh. Hudson served as the director of CCAS from 1976-1989, and directed it again in 2000, 2003-2006, and 2007-2010.

In 2010, Hudson became the director of the Middle East Institute (MEI) and professor of political science at the National University of Singapore (NUS). Hudson was the first director of MEI, which was founded in 2007 as an autonomous research institute within NUS. He continued to direct MEI. Hudson was also professor emeritus at Georgetown University.

In January 2015, he was appointed the Kuwait Foundation Visiting Scholar at Harvard Kennedy School's Middle East Initiative. He was leading a study group at the Kennedy School on "Rethinking the Arab State: The Collapse of Legitimacy in Arab Politics."

During the course of his career, Hudson served on numerous boards and committees related to the fields of political science and Middle East studies. He was a founding member of the Middle East Studies Association of North America, and served as president of the association from 1986 to 1987. He served on the editorial boards of the International Journal of Middle East Studies, the Journal of Arab Affairs, and Cambridge University Press's Middle East Library series. He also served as a manuscript evaluator for over a dozen academic journals. He was a member of the advisory board of the National Council on US-Arab Relations and the board of trustees of the American Institute for Pakistan Studies. Furthermore, he served as an external evaluator for Middle East studies programs at the University of Utah, the University of Virginia, and Kuwait University. He also served on committees within the Social Science Research Council and the American Council of Learned Societies.

== Academic work ==
In addition to his distinguished record of establishing and directing premier centers for Middle East studies (CCAS and MEI), Hudson was an authoritative scholar of contemporary Middle East politics. His most notable contributions are on the problem of political legitimacy in the Arab world, as set out in his seminal work Arab Politics: The Search for Legitimacy. He identified and explored the legitimacy 'deficits' of various Arab governments, focusing on cultural, institutional, and leadership sources of legitimacy. He argued that the question of participation is key to legitimacy, an issue borne out by the Arab uprisings beginning in 2011. Further, new information technologies and social media have invigorated civil societies in these countries.

Hudson also contributed to the scholarship on politics in divided societies, U.S. foreign policy in the Middle East, and regional integration and conflict in the Middle East. On politics in divided societies, he took Lebanon as an ongoing case study (see his book The Precarious Republic), critiquing the theory of consociationalism and advocating the deconstruction rather than the institutionalization of sectarianism in Lebanon and elsewhere in the region, despite the recent apparent resurgence of sectarian polarization. On U.S. foreign policy in the Middle East, Hudson contends that a Pax Americana for the Middle East is illusory, owing to the U.S.'s unbalanced approach to the Palestine-Israel conflict, the negative consequences of military interventions, and the failure to maintain soft power and capitalize on a legacy of goodwill. He asserts that "Imperial America" has been driven by dysfunctional domestic pressures and poor decision-making, and suggested that the so-called "American decline" in the Middle East might not be a bad thing for all concerned. Dealing with questions of regional integration and conflict in the greater Middle East, Hudson explored the interplay between 'rationalist' classical international relations theory approaches and 'sociological' approaches that focus on the domestic decision-making arena. Influenced in his academic training by Kenneth Waltz on the one hand and Karl W. Deutsch on the other, Hudson argued against theoretical stovepiping; understanding integrative and conflict tendencies requires acknowledgement of Waltz's 'third image' approach as well as Deutsch's 'social mobilization approach.'

As a professor at Georgetown University and elsewhere, Hudson taught courses on comparative politics, international politics, comparative politics of the Middle East, Middle East international politics, Lebanese politics, Palestine and the Arab-Israeli conflict, an introduction to social science, networked cultures and networked politics, Yemeni politics, U.S. policy in the Middle East, and politics in divided societies. Hudson was frequently consulted by news organizations for interviews and guest appearances to discuss political developments in the Middle East. Furthermore, he regularly contributed to the media through opinion editorials and short essays. Some of these outlets include Al-Jazeera English, Jadaliyya, Foreign Policy, Singapore's Middle East Insight, The Washington Post, Lebanon's The Daily Star and Al-Mustaqbal, the International Herald Tribune, and others.

Much of Hudson's academic work was supported by competitive grants and fellowships. These included the Robert R. McCormick Fellowship from Yale University (1959–62), American Philosophical Society grants (1965 and 1968), the Harvard Center for International Affairs Fellowship (1965–66), a Guggenheim Fellowship (1975–76), and a Fulbright Senior Fellowship to Yemen in 1994. He was also the recipient of various honors and awards for his academic and administrative contributions to Middle East studies, including the "Jere L. Bacharach Service Award" from the Middle East Studies Association in 2011.

== Publications ==
Books

- Middle East Dilemma: The Politics and Economics of Arab Integration. Editor and Contributor. New York: Columbia University Press, 1999.
- The Palestinians: New Directions. Editor and Contributor. Washington: Georgetown University Center for Contemporary Arab Studies, 1990.
- Alternative Approaches to the Arab-Israeli Conflict. Editor and Contributor. Washington: Georgetown University Center for Contemporary Arab Studies, 1984.
- The American Media and the Arabs. Co-editor and Contributor. Washington: Georgetown University Center for Contemporary Arab Studies, 1980.
- The Arab Future: Critical Issues. Editor and Contributor. Washington: Georgetown University Center for Contemporary Arab Studies, 1978.
- Arab Politics: The Search for Legitimacy. New Haven: Yale University Press, 1977.
- The World Handbook of Political and Social Indicators, 2nd. ed. Co-author. New Haven: Yale University Press, 1972.
- The Precarious Republic: Political Modernization in Lebanon. New York: Random House, 1968; a publication of the Harvard Center for International Affairs; reissued with new preface in 1985 by Westview Press, Boulder, CO.

Scholarly Articles and Chapters

Hudson published chapters in over thirty academic books, and written around sixty articles and thirty book reviews for academic journals and trade publications. These publications include Middle East Policy, PS: Political Science and Politics, 'Comparative Politics, The Yale Law Journal, Middle East Insight, Middle East Journal, Arab Studies Quarterly, Journal of Refugee Studies, International Negotiation, Contention, Current History, Arab Studies Journal, Third World Quarterly, Journal of International Affairs, Journal of Palestine Studies, and various Arabic-language publications, among others.
