= Ali Abunimah =

Palestinian-American journalist (born 1971)

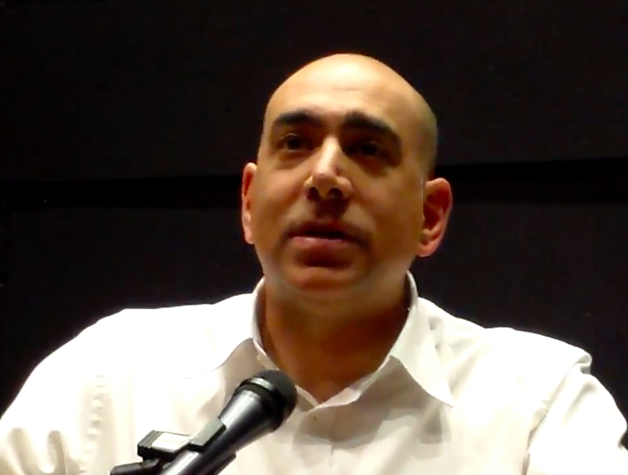
- Abunimah in 2014
- Born: Ali Hasan Abunimah; December 29, 1971 (age 54); Washington, D.C., United States
- Education: Princeton University, University of Chicago
- Occupations: Journalist, activist
- Known for: Executive Director of Electronic Intifada
- Notable work: The Battle for Justice in Palestine (2014)

Ali Abunimah speaks at the Palestine Solidarity Conference in Stuttgart.

Ali Hasan Abunimah (Arabic: علي حسن أبو نعمة, Arabic: [ˈʕali ˈħasan abuˈnɪʕme]; born December 29, 1971) is a Palestinian-American journalist who advocates a one-state solution to the Israeli–Palestinian conflict. A resident of Chicago who contributes regularly to publications such as the Chicago Tribune and the Los Angeles Times, he has served as the vice-president on the board of directors of the Arab American Action Network, is a fellow at the Palestine Center, and is the executive director and a co-founder of The Electronic Intifada website. He has appeared on many television discussion programs on CNN, MSNBC, PBS, and other networks, and in a number of documentaries about the Israeli–Palestinian conflict, including Collecting Stories from Exile: Chicago Palestinians Remember 1948 (1999). In 2014, he published The Battle for Justice in Palestine, which won the Palestine Book Award General Prize.

== Early life and education ==
Born in Washington, D.C., Abunimah spent his early years in the United Kingdom and Belgium before returning to the United States to attend college. His mother is originally from the village of Lifta, now part of Israel, but she became a refugee in the 1948 Palestinian expulsion and flight. His father is from the village of Battir, now in the West Bank, and is a former Jordanian diplomat who served as ambassador to the United Nations. According to his friend Max Blumenthal, in an article for the Mondoweiss website, part of the Abunimah family members say their forefathers came from Spain to Palestine following the fall of Granada in 1492.

Abunimah completed his undergraduate and master's degrees in politics at Princeton University and the University of Chicago. He began participating in activism while at Princeton. While at the University of Chicago, his work as a researcher for a community-based organization resulted in encounters with that city's Arab community, with which he became actively involved. This in turn brought him in contact with the Arab American Action Network, of which he would later serve as vice president and of which he remains a board member.

== Published work ==
=== Electronic Intifada ===
Abunimah is the executive director and one of the founders of The Electronic Intifada website, a non-profit online publication which covers the Israeli–Palestinian conflict from a Palestinian perspective, which was established in 2001. He regularly contributes articles to the site.

During the Gaza war, Abunimah has co-hosted a live stream program, on which he interviewed Refaat Alareer before his death.

=== One Country ===
Abunimah wrote the book One Country: A Bold Proposal to End the Israeli-Palestinian Impasse, which proposes to revive the idea of one state shared by two peoples. Booklist wrote that "Abunimah's approach, inspired by ongoing reconciliation processes in South Africa (and, to a lesser extent, Northern Ireland), is fresh, energetic, and ultimately optimistic that those tired of violence will eventually gravitate toward an inclusive, unified Israel." The International Socialist Review called the book "refreshing" and concluded that "In the struggle for liberation, we must never lose sight of what we are ultimately fighting for, no matter how far off it may seem. When many others have moved away from this discussion, Ali Abunimah's book refocuses it on the right goal, even if he's not clear about the path from here to there." The Arab Studies Journal, noting that "any book proposing a one-state solution to the Zionist-Palestinian conflict" faces major challenges, such as "how to propose a vision of a shared future without papering over the history of injustice" and "how to instill hope without succumbing to naivete," said that Abuminah "navigates these challenges admirably."

=== The Battle for Justice in Palestine ===
In May 2014, Abunimah published another book, The Battle for Justice in Palestine, which analyzes Israel's propaganda initiatives, emphasizes solidarity activism, and connects the struggles in Palestine to those of other oppressed groups across the world. This book was the 2014 winner of the Palestine Book Award General Prize.

=== Other writing ===
In response to the 2008–2009 Gaza War Abunimah wrote an article in The Guardian headlined: "We have no words left". In the article, Abunimah commented about the end of the truce: "But what is Israel's idea of a truce? It is very simple: Palestinians have the right to remain silent while Israel starves them, kills them and continues to violently colonise their land" and "any act of resistance including the peaceful protests against the apartheid wall in the West Bank is always met by Israeli bullets and bombs. There are no rockets launched at Israel from the West Bank, and yet Israel's extrajudicial killings, land theft, settler pogroms and kidnappings never stopped for a day during the truce."

Articles by Abunimah on the Palestinian issue have been published by The New York Times, the Los Angeles Times, The Guardian, Al Jazeera and other publications.

== Activism ==
Abunimah played a key role in the Gaza Freedom March in 2009, a joint effort with Codepink to bring humanitarian relief to Gaza via the Rafah border crossing with Egypt.

In March 2012, Abunimah was among those Palestinian activists who signed a statement criticizing the views of Gilad Atzmon as racist and antisemitic. The signatories to the statement called for "the disavowal of Atzmon by fellow Palestinian organizers, as well as Palestine solidarity activists, and allies of the Palestinian people".

Debating Jonathan Tobin of Commentary on Democracy Now! in July 2012 about the legality of West Bank settlements, Abunimah argued that Israel's "violent settler colonial enterprise in the West Bank has no international legitimacy" and is "maintained through violence and a system of military tyranny and apartheid." He called the settlements "war crimes," described the IDF as "Israel's Jewish sectarian militia," and spoke of "the Jim Crow-like racism at the core of this Zionist ideology." In answer to Tobin's argument that a necessary first step toward agreement on settlements is Palestinian recognition of Israel's right to exist, Abunimah said: "How can Palestinians ever possibly recognize or give legitimacy to an entity that views their mere reproduction as human beings as a mortal threat?"

In 2013, Abunimah traveled to Gaza to speak about digital journalism at the Palestine Festival of Literature (PalFest). Other speakers included China Miéville, Susan Abulhawa, and Jeremy Harding. Although he had previously attempted to visit Gaza, this was his first time in the territory. In addition to attending the festival, he visited various locations in Gaza, including the Popular Committee for Refugees in the Maghazi refugee camp, farms in Khuza’a, and the al-Omari Mosque. Abunimah posted about his journey on Twitter and Electronic Intifada.

In July 2024, a ban on his activities in Germany was issued against him.

=== Arrest ===
In January 2025, Abunimah was arrested by police while on a speaking tour in Zurich, Switzerland. His arrest was condemned by UN human rights experts and activists. He was released and deported after three days of detention. The Swiss Action for Human Rights, a human rights organization in Switzerland, condemned his arrest, stating that it was a violation of "fundamental rights, of freedom of expression in Switzerland, and arbitrary discrimination and violence."

== Views ==
=== Israel and Palestine ===
In 2009, Abunimah wrote an article entitled, "Israeli Jews and the one-state solution", covering some of the same arguments as he raised in his book, One Country. Abunimah's position is that the two-state solution to the Israeli–Palestinian conflict has "no chance of being implemented" and has been superseded by a "de facto binational state" under Israeli control. He supports the creation of a single democratic state, based on the equality of citizens and taking into account the legitimate concerns of Israel's Jewish population.

The journalist Naomi Zeveloff has described Abunimah as "the leading American proponent of a one-state solution to the Israeli–Palestinian conflict, which calls for a shared democratic state from the Mediterranean Sea to the Jordan River. It is a state, in Abunimah's view, in which all residents of Israel and the territories it now occupies would enjoy equal rights and obligations. But in the eyes of his detractors, Abunimah's idea is tantamount to the destruction of the State of Israel, a proposal that would obliterate the Jewish character of the country in favor of majority Arab rule."

Abunimah opposes Zionism, which he describes as "a dying project, in retreat and failing to find new recruits." He argues that Zionism's promotion of Jewish self-determination in Israel and Palestine's "intermixed population" has the effect of maintaining "a status quo in which Israeli Jews exercise power in perpetuity." Abunimah's position is that Palestinians should pursue coercive measures against Israel such as the non-violent Boycott, Divestment and Sanctions (B.D.S.) movement. "Ultimately, I believe," he wrote in July 2012, "the logic and inevitability of a single state will be accepted. As in South Africa and Northern Ireland, any just solution will involve a difficult and lengthy process of renegotiating political, economic and cultural relationships. But that is where the debate, unstoppably, is shifting."

According to the Jerusalem Post he has compared Israel to Nazi Germany In an article in the Electronic Intifada, he cited comparisons of Israel to Nazi Germany made by Gerald Kaufman. In 2010, he tweeted that "Supporting Zionism is not atonement for the Holocaust, but its continuation in spirit" and has also said "Zionism is one of the worst forms of anti-Semitism in existence today". In his opinion, the Israeli press is comparable to Der Stürmer and IDF statements are the word "of a Nazi" and Gaza is a "ghetto for surplus non-Jews".

He has acknowledged the potential for anti-Jewish violence in Israel should a one-state solution be realized, stating in a Q&A at a 2009 conference at Hampshire College: "You can never have an absolute guarantee about what the future will be like. ... You cannot guarantee that if there was a one-state solution it wouldn't, it would be…the best scenario is if it's more in the direction of South Africa and Northern Ireland than Zimbabwe. But we couldn't rule out, you know, some disastrous situation, like Zimbabwe."

Abunimah has given two theories about the strong relationship between the U.S. and Israel: first, he said Israel plays an important role in U.S. imperialism by allowing it to control the Middle East and their resources; second, he believes "there are powerful organizations and networks that consider support for Israel very important and they influence the politics of the United States through elections and contributions to political campaigns to make candidates adopt to Israel's position."

"The Arab-Zionist conflict did not begin in 1948 but rather long before it," Abunimah maintained in a 2009 lecture. It began, he said, "when the Zionists came to Palestine in the beginning of the last century, and was exacerbated with the appearance of the refugee problem." He made the following argument: "If for example the Jews returned to their original countries, those countries would be shocked, and those are their countries who exported them to Palestine. So how can these countries, most of which sing the praises of democracy and human rights, be silent about the right of return of the Palestinian people, the people and owners of the land, to their villages and cities?" He also claimed that "Zionism is strong, but it has not been renewed or rooted in the land of Palestine, and the Palestinians hold their land and identities dearly and are on their way to a majority."

=== Barack Obama ===
Abunimah met Barack Obama in 2004 when the latter was a member of the Illinois State Senate. Abunimah wrote in 2007 that he had met Obama around half a dozen times before Obama held elective office. The events were often at Chicago-based Arab-American and Palestinian events, including a 1998 fundraiser at which Edward Saïd was the keynote speaker. Abunimah accused Obama of having cut off his relationships with Arab Americans after his election to the U.S. Senate. "Obama said that he is sympathetic to the Palestinians," Abunimah has declared, "but I do not believe that. ... I believe that he is political and he does not sympathize with the Palestinians in light of his recent positions and actions. He said he was sympathetic to the Palestinians because he needed their votes in order to be elected."

Abunimah strongly criticized Obama's approach to Mid-East affairs, writing that the president "entrenched" the policies of his predecessor, George W. Bush, and has not contributed to "even the pretense of a serious peace effort." A 2007 article in New York's Jewish Week reported that Palestinian-American historian and Israel critic Rashid Khalidi held an Obama fundraiser in his home when Obama was running for the Senate, and quoted Abunimah as saying that Obama “convinced me he was very aware of the issues [and] critical of U.S. bias toward Israel and lack of sensitivity to Arabs....He was very supportive of U.S. pressure on Israel.'"

Abunimah said on the TV and radio program Democracy Now! in 2008 that he had known Barack Obama "for many years as my state senator—when he used to attend events in the Palestinian community in Chicago all the time." Abunimah added that he had introduced Obama in 1999 at a "community fundraiser for the community center in Deheisha refugee camp in the occupied West Bank. And that's just one example of how Barack Obama used to be very comfortable speaking up for and being associated with Palestinian rights and opposing the Israeli occupation," Abunimah said. In May 2012, Abunimah wrote that the United States under Obama was leading a campaign "to close every door to justice for Palestinians," and that his ambassador to the United Nations, Susan Rice is leading "a relentless anti-Palestinian crusade at the UN." He also wrote that "the Susan Rices and William Hagues of the world are not only silent about these crimes, but fully complicit in them," referring to the Palestinian hunger strikers in Israeli prisons.

== See also ==
- History of Palestinian journalism
