= Samih Farsoun =

- سميح فرسون
- Samih Farsoun
- Born: 1937; Haifa, Mandatory Palestine
- Died: June 9, 2005 (aged 67–68); New Buffalo, Michigan, US

Academic background
- Education: University of Connecticut

Academic work
- Discipline: Sociology

Samih K. Farsoun (Arabic: سميح فرسون) (1937 – June 9, 2005) was a professor emeritus of sociology at American University, where he taught for thirty years until his retirement in 2003.

== Biography ==
Farsoun was born in Haifa, Palestine, in 1937. The family was forced to leave their hometown during the Nakba in 1948. They settled in Beirut. He graduated from Hamilton College in New York. He received a master's degree in 1961 and a PhD in 1971, both in sociology from the University of Connecticut. He died June 9 of a heart attack while on a walk with his wife in New Buffalo, Michigan. He was a resident of Florida and Washington, D.C. During his career at AU, Farsoun served as chairman of the Department of Sociology for eleven years, chairman and member of numerous university-wide committees. He also established (with John Willoughby) the Arab Studies minor in the Sociology department in 2001.

Farsoun was the founding dean of the College of Arts and Sciences at the newly established American University of Sharjah in the United Arab Emirates from 1997 to 1999. In 2004, Farsoun was named founding dean of Academic Affairs and the College of Arts and Sciences at the newly established American University of Kuwait, where he served until February 2005.

An activist and mentor to young Arab-Americans, Farsoun was a founding member of several organizations and the author or editor of books and other writings on aspects of the Arab world, Third World development and the political economy of the Middle East. He lectured at conferences and provided commentary on radio and television news shows on the Middle East.

His accomplishments include:

- Founding member and president of the Association of Arab American University Graduates
- Founding member of the Arab Sociological Association.
- Editor of Arab Studies Quarterly
- Member of the International Advisory Board of the Holy Land Studies: A Multidisciplinary Journal
- Founding fellow of the Middle East Studies Association of North America;
- Board member of Partners for Peace, formerly the American Alliance for Palestinian Human Rights in Washington, D.C.
- Board member of the Middle East Children's Alliance in Berkeley, California

Farsoun was one of the first members of the board of directors of the Jerusalem Fund for Education and Community Development and first member of the executive committee of the Center for Policy Analysis on Palestine, now the Palestine Center, both based in Washington. He was a founding member of the Trans-Arab Research Institute in Boston.

Farsoun was married to Katha Kissman and his daughter was Rouwayda Farsoun, a Palestinian adoptee from the Tel al-Zaatar Refugee Camp in Lebanon.

== Works ==
Farsoun wrote books about the sociology and politics of the Middle East:

- "Palestine and the Palestinians" (1997)
  - An updated Arabic edition was published in Beirut in 2003
  - An updated second edition, co-authored with Naseer Aruri, was published in 2006
- "Culture and Customs of the Palestinians" (2004)

Additionally, he published papers, book chapters and articles. His works have been translated into several languages, including Arabic, Persian, French, Italian and German. Farsoun also published columns in Arabic and English journals and newspapers.
