= Lyman Ward (actor) =

Canadian actor

- Born: Saint John, New Brunswick, Canada
- Occupation: Actor
- Years active: 1971–present
- Spouse: Cindy Pickett (m. 1986; div. 1992)
- Children: 2

Lyman Ward is a Canadian actor best known for his roles in Creature (1984), Ferris Bueller's Day Off (1986), and Milk and Honey (1988).

== Life and career ==
Ward was born and raised in Saint John, New Brunswick and graduated from St. Malachy's Memorial High School in the class of 1959, and then in 1963 from St. Thomas University which was located at the time in Miramichi, New Brunswick before relocating to Fredericton in 1964.

He appeared on the first episode of Laverne & Shirley as Tad Schotz, but is most noted for playing Ferris Bueller's father in Ferris Bueller's Day Off (1986). In 1990, Ward was cast as Jim Walsh in the pilot of the show Beverly Hills, 90210. Producers later recast the role and his scenes were cut and reshot with James Eckhouse. In 2001, he made a cameo appearance in the movie Not Another Teen Movie as Mr. Wyler, spoofing his role in Ferris Bueller's Day Off. Ward also played a minor role in Planes, Trains and Automobiles (1987) as John, one of the marketers.

Lyman Ward and Second City actor Sandra Bogan lived together in 1985. Ward met Cindy Pickett on the set of Ferris Bueller, where they played the parents of the teenage protagonist in the 1986 film. They married in real life, had two children together, then divorced shortly after playing the parents of the teenage protagonist in the 1992 film Sleepwalkers.

Ward published a novel titled Fortune's Tide in 2016, a historical fiction based in his home town of Saint John.

He continues to act in both films and television.

== Filmography ==
- Coffy (1973) – Orderly
- One Day at a Time (Season 1 Episode 2) (1975) – Steve Blanchard
- Laverne & Shirley (1976) – Tad Shotz
- The Great Smokey Roadblock (1977) – Leland
- Alice (1978) episode 6 Season 3 as Burt Gilman (a date of Alice's)
- Battlestar Galactica (1979) – Karibdis
- The Happy Hooker Goes Hollywood (1980) – Real Estate Agent
- Barney Miller (1980 episode "Agent Orange" as Len Macready, 1982 episode "Examination Day" as Harv Jetter)
- Whose Life Is It Anyway? (1981) – Emergency Room Doctor
- Love Letters (1983) – Morgan Crawford
- Moscow on the Hudson (1984) – Agent Williams
- Young Lust (1984)
- Protocol (1984) – Senator Kenworthy
- Creature (1985) – David Perkins
- A Nightmare on Elm Street 2: Freddy's Revenge (1985) – Mr. Grady
- Ferris Bueller's Day Off (1986) – Tom Bueller
- Planes, Trains and Automobiles (1987) – John (uncredited)
- Perfect Victims (1988) – Steven Hack
- Milk and Honey (1988) – Adam Bernardi
- She's Having a Baby (1988) – Himself (uncredited)
- Riding the Edge (1989) – John
- Best Shots (1990) – Roger Boro
- Murder, She Wrote (1991) – Mitchell Lawrence
- Guilty as Charged (1991) – Stanford
- The Taking of Beverly Hills (1991) – Chief Healy
- Mikey (1992) – Mr. Jenkins
- Sleepwalkers (1992) – Mr. Robertson
- The Beverly Hillbillies (1992) - Ben Aidem
- "The Wonder Years" (Season 5, Episode 15) "Of Mastodons and Men" (1993) – Chief Gallo
- No Dessert, Dad, till You Mow the Lawn (1994) – Larry
- The Wrong Woman (1995) – Jonah Slide
- Independence Day (1996) – Secret Service Agent
- The Secret Agent Club (1996) – SHADOW General
- Not Another Teen Movie (2001) – Mr. Wyler
- Quiet Kill (2004) – Dr. Rubin
- Rumor Has It (2005) – Charity Dinner Guests
- Two:Thirteen (2009) – Police Captain
- Farah Goes Bang (2013) – Walter
- Transparent (2015) – Dean Carl Spitzer
- In the Forest (2022) – Stan (Grandpa)
