= Hussein Barghouthi =

Palestinian poet (1954–2002)

- حسين جميل برغوثي
- Born: 5 May 1954; Kobar, Jordanian West Bank
- Died: 1 May 2002 (aged 47); Kobar, West Bank
- Other names: Hussein Jamil Barghouthi
- Occupations: Poet, writer, essayist, critic, lyricist, playwright and philosopher

Hussein Jamil Barghouthi, also spelled Barghouti, (May 5, 1954 – May 1, 2002, Arabic: حسين جميل برغوثي) was a Palestinian poet, writer, essayist, critic, lyricist, playwright and philosopher, born in the Palestinian village of Kobar in the Ramallah and al-Bireh Governorate. Barghouthi lived his childhood between Kobar, where his mother lived, and Beirut, where his father worked. An outcast since childhood, seen and treated by his society as different and distant for being unique, he found his friends to be the rocks and trees of his village, and the words of his language. He was misunderstood by his surroundings, and was too different from his society by the time he reached his last year in highschool, when he read out loud one of his poems for the first time in a poetry contest. The contest was held by Jordanian education ministry, during the Jordanian custody of the West Bank, and Barghouthi was deprived of 1st place because the ministry of education thought he had stolen a poem from some famous author. "Ignorance is not an excuse" replied Barghouthi, in front of the live audience. Barghouthi got his high school diploma from Amir Hassan School in Birzeit.

He went on to continue his studies in Budapest, Hungary, studying Political Science and State Finance there for 5 years. After returning to Palestine, he studied at Birzeit University and obtained his BA English literature from in 1983, and taught there for one year before leaving to obtain both his M.A. (1987) and Ph.D. (1992) in Comparative Literature from the University of Washington - Seattle. He returned to Palestine to become a professor of Philosophy and Cultural Studies at Birzeit University, and went on to work for three years in Al-Quds University as a professor of Literature Critique and Theater in 1997, during which he was a founding member of the Palestinian “House of Poetry” and Publishing Manager in a couple of literature magazines.

Barghouthi died on May 1, 2002, in Ramallah Hospital, after a long struggle with cancer.

== Works ==
The various and diverse works of Hussein Barghouthi include novels, poetry, autobiography, critique, folklore, song lyrics, theater and cinema script, and many intellectual research and studies scattered in newspapers, books and magazines. Only two of his works were translated, both into French by Marianne Weiss, which are “The Blue Light” and “I’ll be among the almonds”. His top works include:

=== "The Blue Light" ===
Barghouthi wrote his masterpiece, “The blue light” (2001), on his experience of living with the unorthodox, outcast and “mad” people of the streets of Seattle, frequenting at “The Grand Illusion” cinema, “The Blue Moon” bar and “The Last Exit” café, drawn to them by their names. A book that levitates the standards of any reader, in which Barghouthi describes his journey with Barry, a Sufi Whirling Dervish of Konyan origin who left his academic life and homeland to become a “homeless madman, or any other word we use to describe those we don’t understand”. The book is an exploration of Hussein's madness and spiritual paradox, and the confluence of the “mountain child and the sea”, the two opposite poles of his spirit; A book similar to the works of America's Beat Generation. The book was translated to French in the title of "Lumière bleue", by Marianne Weiss in 2004. An English translation by Fady Joudah was publishded by Seagull Books in 2023.

=== "The Third Bank of The Jordan River" ===
He wrote his book “The third bank of the Jordan River”, published first in 1984, on his journey in Europe, describing his mental state at the time, that was edging both reality and insanity and not settling in either. Making the Jordan River an analogy, he uses it to explain that while there are two banks to the river of life, homeland and exile, there are some people destined to live in the virtual third bank; The bank of spiritualism, thought, passion, pain, love, magnitude, madness and poetry. A book that takes you on a trip, and might bring you to tears, and make you fall in love with it.

=== "Among the Almond Trees" ===
Written in his last years in the same time as “The blue light”, his autobiography, Among the Almond Trees, documents his final years of struggling with cancer, in which he reflects on his origins, beginnings and end, and paints an image of his beautiful village that was, and still is, subject to colonialism. The book was meant to give the magical place of “Deir al Juwani”, an area of wilderness and mountains in the village of Kobar, eternal life, and so it did. The reader can live in the place that was slowly being deformed by colonialism and civilization. “Tell her, no matter what happens… If you visit me, I’ll be among the almonds”, and so it was; Barghouthi was buried between the almond trees in the garden of his mother's house. The book was later translated to French by Marianne Weiss, and published as "Je Serai Parmi les Amandiers" in 2008. Among the Almond Trees, translated into English by Ibrahim Muhawi in June 2022, was a 2023 winner of the Palestine Book Award.

=== "The Rosette Stone" ===
“The Rosette Stone”, published in 2002, is a postmodern script that cannot be framed into one style or genre of literature. The title of the book is an analogy to the Rosetta stone that was discovered in Egypt, which was the key to deciphering the hieroglyphic language of ancient Egypt and uncover the truth of its three thousand year history. His best and most difficult work, in his own belief, where every other work he wrote was aimed to remove the barriers between him and his reader, allowing the reader to understand his script, vision and total personality.

=== “The Demise of The 7th Wall: Psychological Struggle In Literature” ===
Considered a cornerstone in cognition and psychology, in the form of an extended essay, the book serves as a therapist to the reader. It analyzes the history of psychological conflict. The book explains how every individual creates his own "main reason" of existing, and how the time and place in which a person is born influences the creation of this reason. He introduces is it saying "The main reason is no more than a complicated reflection of the dominant social relations in a certain phase of time". The book focuses on the history of psychological struggle, rather than on the history of the figures and characters it discusses. "There is no absolute main reason for every time and place, and so the main reason develops and changes as history develops and changes", he explains. "Each individual can change, and choose with freedom that is proportional to his time, his own main reason. This depends on the opportunities given by the historical period in which he lives", and following that concept, the book follows the main reason through every era.

Starting from Brahmanism, the book goes on to include the development and diversification of psychological conflict through time and place, including that of many poets like Mudhafar Al-Nawab and Al-Mutanabbi, and various fictional characters of literature from writers such as Shakespeare and Dostoevsky. It tracks the origins of conflict in human life, cognition and society, and is considered the key to understanding one’s own difficulties, and understanding the rest of his books.

=== "The Emptiness That Saw The Details" ===
A postmortem accumulation of five writings of various subjects: The beginning of existence, a philosophical analysis of the First Intifada, the magnitude of experience, the paradox caused in Palestine by capitalism and an analysis of the concepts of time and place; A book that brings together many cultures, visions and times.

==== "The emptiness that saw the details" ====
A script that includes 29 quotes from books, poetry, songs and writings of divergent figures such as Mahmoud Darwish, Al-Mutanabbi, Friedrich Nietzsche, Thomas Hardy, Fyodor Dostoevsky and Maxim Gorky, and lyrics from songs such as Hotel California. Written in 1st person narrative, the script ends with a poem by Barghouthi himself. The script was first published in Ugarit magazine in 1996, of which Barghouthi was chief editor. The magazine was named after the ancient city of Ugarit.

==== "An ordinary memory of an extraordinary time" ====
Written in Ramallah, the script is a reflection of Barghouthi's experience of the First Intifada years later. He witnessed the beginning of the Intifada and lived in Ramallah for the most part of it, before leaving to study in Seattle. The script, however, is far from political, and is a contemplation on the period he spent in Palestine during that extraordinary time. An eccentric script in which Barghouthi shows his style of free, unbound writing.

==== "The I and the place" ====
Starting with a trip to Jibya, a woodland between the villages of Kobar and Umm Safa, Barghouthi loses his way and enters a state of disorientation - also mentioned in his other books - on his way back to the city. After confusing Kobar with Umm Safa, it seems to him that the place he had known for years was once again new to him. Building on this incident, he explores the 'reality' of things in rather than the 'name' of things, and explains the state of 'losing realization' that he intermittently enters and talks about in his other books. "I see something I don't know, and I know something I don't see" he says, describing the incident. "Where is Umm Safa? where is everything? the answer is clear: Umm Safa is everywhere, sometimes on my right, sometimes on my left, sometimes in the north-east and so on; to determine the exact place of where Umm Safa is, I must determine the exact place in which I am. And if I lose the orientation of the place I'm in, I lose the orientation of where it is as well, and vice versa." he says, explaining the relationship between the I and the place. "I usually say this my house, and this is my way. This 'my' in 'my house' and 'my way' is an indication of the desire to own." he says. "Take the 'my' out of 'my realization' and it gets lost, like the way home, and I find myself in a strange state; there is 'a' realization, but it's not mine" he also says, and continues to follow through this philosophy to the furthest extent. A philosophy similar to that of Lao-Tzu, which he also mentions in this script.

==== "On the extinct place" ====
This piece, written first in Kobar, focuses on “the extinct place” which is any place that loses its history and ‘depth’. Barghouthi starts with an analysis of the architectural inconsistency of Ramallah city. The transformation of architecture from normal houses and rural life in the 1960s in Palestine, to new and bigger buildings, towers and villas that all “seem to say that the world is split only into ‘what is me, and what is not me’”. This development caused what is called “the phenomenon of the extinct place”, which is the same place in which a person feels belonging, after urbanization or change. The diverse architecture caused the city to have a ‘split personality’, one being its surface and the other its depth.

Barghouthi explores the Palestinian subconscious, and how this domination of “the extinct place” imprinted somewhat of a ‘fall’ in the Palestinian mind, in which there is an original sin; the Nakba. And the ‘return’ to that lost depth of the place, similar to the ascension to heaven, is the ray of hope that battles the extinct place; this concept, says Barghouthi, defines the national and humanitarian Palestinian self.

The city of Ramallah, he explains, is a constant battle between the historical and the extinct place, due to the external entry of colonialism and the internal entry of capitalism and private ownership, “a plot similar to a plot of a realistic novel of a temporal and spatial progression” with a tangible script. Perceiving ‘place’ in time as a ‘past place’ that goes through the present and into the future created a dominance of memory and past over Palestine, which, in turn, annihilated the feeling of belonging to ‘the extinct place’ (Ramallah) and a feeling of exile from a ‘past place’.

==== "The illusion of a beginning... the ghost of the place" ====
Barghouthi explores and compares concepts from various religions and mythology, including the Akhenaten religion, The Book of Genesis, Enlil of the Sumerian religion, Brahmanism, African mythology, Plato's Symposium, Persian, Greek and Mexican mythology.

The title, which is also the final conclusion of the script, can be explained in the last page:

"That which was 'before the beginning' haunts it like an invisible ghost, and it tries to bury it, or deny it, but fails. The beginning's attempt to hide what is before it is the true beginning, precisely like the attempt of 'the end' to hide what is after it, in order to seal that same beginning, is the true 'ending'. i.e the beginning is in need, right from the start, of a certain illusion of it being 'the beginning'; The beginning's illusion of itself is the start of the beginning, and this illusion takes a spatial form. It is, necessarily, a spatial illusion of 'place'."

== Philosophy ==
Barghouthi's philosophy had no boundaries, and cannot be wholly summed up. The way the reader can understand his thought is through reading his works and trying to build a personal connection between the author and himself.

He did not seek to be framed into a certain or single genre, like 'poet' or 'philosopher''. Barghouthi's works are inter-connected; one book might explain a missing part of another book, or one poem might explain a sentence in one of his novels.

He believed that the reader should be an active thinker and searcher, rather than just a receiver of knowledge. His philosophy is based on that each individual should re-build his “pyramid of thought”, and that the reader has to be an active receptor and participator in this process of developing creativity. “Empty your mind of its contents”, as he said in The Blue Light.

He saw that the problem with the Arab mind was that "it lost its ability to create", and that's what he sought not to lose: his ability to create. In his writings, he presented new concepts to explain the mind, heart, language, psychological conflict, time, memory, cancer, blossom, occupation, love, exile, nature, passion, pain, magnitude, madness and poetry; all of which are themes discussed in his various works.

The experience, he believed, is more important than the place. Each person creates his own experience in any place; the place does not determine one's experience. There should not be difference, but rather harmony, between his writing and his life, and that is why his impact was not solely through his books but also through his interaction with any person, whether that person may be his student, friend or just a stranger. He was looked upon as a phenomenon by readers and other authors and critics. His works are constantly being studied and deciphered, considering that his popularity in the mainstream rose during the last years of his life and the few years after his death, when his most well-known works were published, including his two postmortem auto-biographies (The Blue Light) and (I’ll Be Among The Almonds).

== Popularity ==
Barghouthi's popularity came from his experimentation with literature, both in his narrative and poetry. His holistic approach to each genre of literature, which combined philosophy and unbound experimentation with language, was a new and revolutionary method of writing. His poetry was not popularized in its first years, due to the style of writing being different from conventional Arabic poetry. In many of his poetic writings, he creates new words which he conceived from philosophical exploration; it was his style, more than the work itself, that gained Barghouthi his uniqueness and popularity.

It was, however, the narrative works that brought more interest to his previous, shunned works. The publishing of his postmortem narratives, including his masterpiece "The Blue Light", revived interest in his poetry which his narratives aimed to help decipher. Barghouthi's personal focus was his poetry, which he considered most important, and aimed to help the reader better understand it through writing narratives.

His popularity in the Arab world grew after the release of his postmortem narratives, mostly in his homeland Palestine, which increased interest and support for publishing older works of his, like "The Vision" and "Liquid Mirrors", both which are poetry books; his narratives are considered a simpler form of his poetry.

Barghouthi's works, however, have not been globalized because not many have yet been translated. Only two of his books, "The Blue Light" and "I'll be among the almonds", were translated, both only into French. He never had the chance to popularize or translate the works himself, since he had little time to even write them, having struggled with cancer while writing them, and died before they were published. His main focus, in addition, was life itself and not popularity or fame, and so he lived the majority of his life with his works unknown, before the final years when his narratives gained great attention.

== See also ==
- Barghouthi
- A short biography
- The language of almonds a documentary about Hussein al Barghouthi, directed by Salim Abu Jabal.
