= Lorenzo Kamel =

Italian historian (born 1980)

Lorenzo Kamel (born 1 October 1980) is Professor of Global History and History of the Middle East and North Africa at the University of Turin, director of the Istituto Affari Internazionali's Research Studies, and scientific director of the "New-Med Research Network".

== Career ==
He held teaching and research positions in several universities in the Middle East, the United States, and Europe, including the Albert-Ludwigs-Universität Freiburg, where he served as a Marie Curie Experienced Researcher, and Harvard University, where, among other appointments, he was a postdoctoral fellow for two years with a project entitled "Artificial Nations? The Sykes-Picot and the Islamic State's narratives in a historical perspective". He holds a two-year M.A. in Israeli society and politics from the Hebrew University of Jerusalem, a Ph.D. in history from the University of Bologna, and lived for years in several countries in the Middle East, including, with visiting appointments, Egypt ('Ain Shams University), the Palestinian Territories (Birzeit University), Israel (Hebrew University), and Turkey (Bilkent University).

== Publications ==
He authored twelve books on Global History, Middle Eastern and Mediterranean affairs, including Imperial perceptions of Palestine: British Influence and Power in Late Ottoman Times, an award-winning and widely acclaimed book based on sources from 17 archives. The Cambridge Review of International Affairs pointed out that the book "broadens the existing scholarship with a well-researched, even-handed volume that clearly fills a hole in the historiography" while the Journal of Palestine Studies reviewed the book stating that it provides a "fascinating and convincing interpretive analysis". Sara Roy (Harvard University) noted that the book is a "powerful and truly illuminating study", while Hebrew University's Moshe Ma'oz contended that "for anyone with an interest in deconstructing the present of our region this book is a must".

Brenda Andrias reviewed his book History Below the Global, noticing that "it takes us through an extensive sweep of history in such an informative and unique way that it offers the reader countless 'aha' moments", while Hamid Dabashi argued that it is "an inaugural prose where our future historiography has already started".

The Middle East from Empire to Sealed Identities, was praised by Nicholas Doumanis as "one of the most definitive works on the transition from empire to nation-state". Former MESA's President, Beth Baron, wrote that the book "will make an important mark on the field", while Brian A. Catlos (University of Colorado Boulder) contended that it provides "chronological continuation of much of the most interesting work being done in pre-modern Mediterranean Studies". His publications include also over 30 articles on leading academic journals such as Journal of Genocide Research, British Journal of Middle Eastern Studies, Mediterranean Politics, Peace and Change, Eurasian Studies, New Middle Eastern Studies, Passato e Presente, Oriente Moderno, and over 200 articles and policy papers on Al Jazeera, Ha'aretz, Project Syndicate,, and other media outlets in 10 languages, in over 30 countries. He frequently appears as a political commentator on Al Jazeera English, France 24, The New York Times and other international media.

He is a board member of a number of academic journals, including Palgrave Communications, Eurostudium, Passato e Presente, and frequently acts as a peer-reviewer for the European Research Council (ERC Consolidator Grant "The Study of the Human Past"), Cambridge University Press, International Affairs (Chatham House), and other institutions, publishing houses and journals.

== Prizes ==
He was awarded with the 2010 "Giuseppe Sciacca International Prize", the Fritz Thyssen Stiftung Grant (2015), the 2016 Palestine Book Awards (1st prize, academic section).
