= Hisham Sharabi =

Palestinian academic

- Born: 1927; Jaffa, Mandatory Palestine
- Died: 2005 (aged 77–78); Beirut, Lebanon
- Occupation: Non-fiction writer

Academic work
- Discipline: History
- Institutions: Georgetown University

Hisham Sharabi (Arabic: هشام الشرابي) (1927 Jaffa, Mandatory Palestine – 2005 Beirut, Lebanon) was a Palestinian historian and writer. He was Professor Emeritus of History and Umar al-Mukhtar Chair of Arab Culture at Georgetown University, where he was a specialist in European intellectual history and social thought. He died of cancer at the American University of Beirut hospital on January 13, 2005.

== Early life and education ==
He spent his early years growing up in Jaffa, Palestine and Acre, Palestine before attending American University in Beirut, where he graduated with a B.A. in Philosophy. He then traveled to study at the University of Chicago, where he completed an M.A. in Philosophy in 1949. Politically active from a young age, Sharabi then returned to serve as editor of the Syrian Social Nationalist Party’s monthly magazine al-Jil al-Jadid (The New Generation). Forced to flee to Jordan after the parties disbanding in 1949, Sharabi returned to the United States where he completed a Ph.D. in the history of culture, again at the University at Chicago. That same year, he began to teach at Georgetown University, where he gained full professorship in eleven years; his chair was endowed by the Libyan government.

== Controversy ==
Sharabi, while an ardent supporter of Palestinian rights, was not beyond criticizing the Palestinian governing bodies. According to a story in the Washington Post, "In 1999, after PLO Chairman Yasser Arafat ordered the arrests of 11 Palestinian academics who had accused his administration of 'tyranny and corruption,' Dr. Sharabi, along with Edward Said of Columbia University, signed a letter calling the arrests 'a totally unjustifiable attack on the freedom of expression.'" Nine of the lawmakers were immune from arrest, but two later accused the Palestinian police of attacking them.

== Legacy ==
He promoted the understanding of the Arab culture, establishing in 1973, along with several other colleagues, the Georgetown Center for Contemporary Arab Studies with funding from the governments of the United States, Saudi Arabia, Oman, the United Arab Emirates, and Libya, as well as American corporations with business interests in the Middle East. In 1977, Georgetown University "awarded Dr. Sharabi the Umar Al-Mukhtar Chair in Arab Culture in recognition of his distinguished intellectual contributions and his efforts to promote Arab studies." Sharabi formed, later that same year, the Jerusalem Fund for Education and Community Development, an organization that worked on educational, cultural and health issues of Palestinians. He served as Chairman of Board until his death in 2005. In 1991, he formed what is now known as the Palestine Center, which serves as a think tank educating the general public on Palestinian Political Issues.

== Publications ==
Author of 18 books and numerous articles and editorials, he was well respected as a foremost 20th-century Arab intellectual, contributing greatly to the study of Arabic culture. Sharabi also published several books himself on Arabic culture and philosophy. In honor of his work in both the European and Arab fields, the Department of history at Georgetown convened an international two-day symposium in 2002 titled ‘The Role of the Intellectual in Contemporary Political Life.’ Also named in his honor is the annual Hisham Sharabi graduate essay contest, begun by the Department's graduate students upon Sharabi's retirement in 1998.

- Governments and Politics of the Middle East in the Twentieth Century. Van Nostrand. 1962.
- Nationalism and Revolution in the Arab World (the Middle East and North Africa). Van Nostrand. 1966.
- Neopatriarchy: A Theory of Distorted Change in Arab Society. Oxford University Press. 1988.
- Palestine and Israel: The Lethal Dilemma. Pegasus. 1969.
- Arab Intellectuals and the West. Johns Hopkins Press. 1970.
- Palestine Guerillas: Their Credibility and Effectiveness (PDF). Georgetown University. 1970.
- The Next Arab Decade: Alternative Futures. Westview Press. 1988.
- Theory, Politics, and the Arab World: Critical Responses. Routledge. 1991.
- صور الماضي: سيرة ذاتية [Images of the Past: An Autobiography]. 1993.
- Embers and Ashes: memoirs of an Arab intellectual. Translated by Boullata, Issa J. Olive Branch Press. 2008.

== See also ==
- Neopatriarchy
