= Sarah Aziza =

Palestinian American writer, translator, and journalist

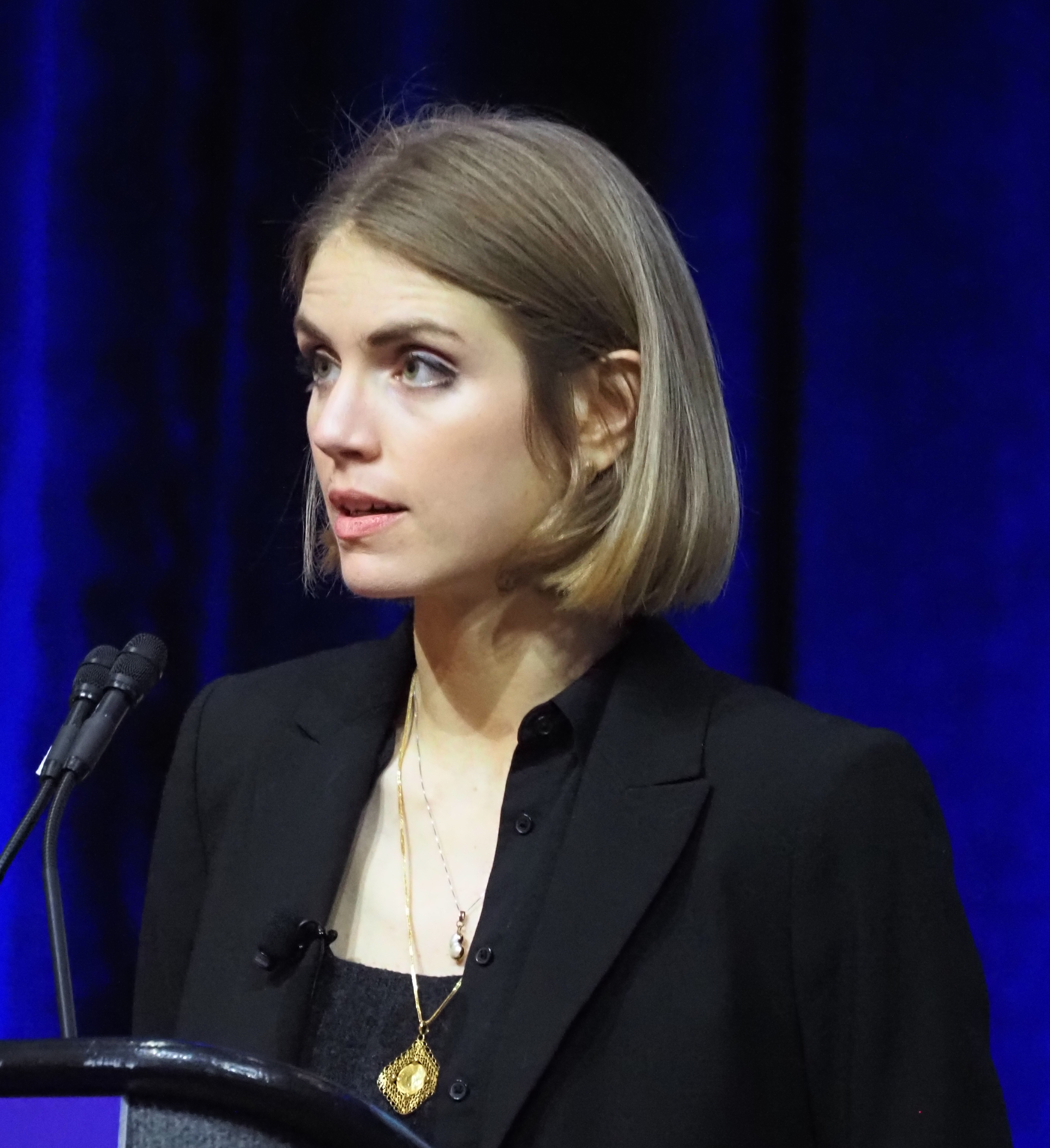
- Aziza at the 2026 AWP Conference
- Occupations: Writer; translator; journalist
- Writing career
- Notable works: The Hollow Half: A Memoir of Bodies and Borders (2025)
- Notable awards: Palestine Book Award; Anisfield-Wolf Book Award

Sarah Aziza is a Palestinian American writer, translator, and journalist. Her work has appeared in outlets including The Guardian, Harper's Magazine, the Baffler, the Paris Review, Best American Essays, the Washington Post, and The New Yorker website, among others. She is also a frequent contributor to The Nation.

She is the author of the memoir The Hollow Half: A Memoir of Bodies and Borders (Catapult, 2025). In 2025, The Hollow Half is the winner of the Palestine Book Awards; in 2026, the Anisfield-Wolf Book Award, the Brooklyn Public Library Book Prize, an Arab American Book Award honorable mention, and was named a finalist for the Lambda Literary Award for Nonfiction.

== The Hollow Half ==
The Hollow Half: A Memoir of Bodies and Borders was published by Catapult Books in 2025.

=== Reception ===
The book was named a Best Book of the Year by New York Magazine, Elle, Bookpage, the San Francisco Chronicle, and others. Isle McLeroy wrote for Vulture that The Hollow Half is “a remarkable achievement, formally inventive, refreshingly honest, and politically sharp.” Mónica Teresa Ortiz of BookPage praised Aziza's "stunning" prose and wrote that the memoir moves effortlessly across geographies, timelines, and languages. The book also received positive reviews in Michigan Quarterly Review and Publishers Weekly. Library Journal and Bookpage gave the book a starred review.

== Awards and honors ==
- Memoire Award, Palestine Book Awards (2025), for The Hollow Half.
- Finalist, Lambda Literary Award for LGBTQ+ Nonfiction (2026), for The Hollow Half.
- Winner (Memoir), Anisfield-Wolf Book Awards (2026), for The Hollow Half.
- United States Artists Fellow (Writing, 2026).
