= The Battle for Justice in Palestine =

2014 book about Palestine by Ali Abunimah

- Author: Ali Abunimah
- Publisher: Haymarket Books
- Publication date: 2014
- ISBN: 9781608463244

The Battle for Justice in Palestine is a 2014 book by Ali Abunimah. It was the winner of the Palestine Book Award and has been widely reviewed.
