= Jibiya, Ramallah =

- Municipality type D (Village council)

Arabic transcription(s)
  - Arabic: جبيّا
- Location of Jibiya, Ramallah within Palestine
- Coordinates: 31°59′50″N 35°09′40″E
- Palestine grid: 165/156
- State: State of Palestine
- Governorate: Ramallah and al-Bireh

Government
  - Type: Village council

Population (2017)
  - Total: 156
- Name meaning: Jibia, from personal name

Jibiya is a Palestinian village in the Ramallah and al-Bireh Governorate. It was founded after the 16th century. It is mentioned in text from 1697.

== Location ==
Jibiya is located 11.2 kilometers (7.0 mi) north of Ramallah. It is bordered by Burham to the east, Umm Safa the east, north and west, and Kobar to the west and south.

== History ==
Pottery sherds from the Hellenistic, Byzantine, and Umayyad/Abbasid eras have been found here.

It has been suggested that this was Geba in the Onomasticon, and the Crusader place called Gebea, but both these identifications have now been discarded.

Pottery sherds from the Mamluk era have also been found here.

=== Ottoman era ===
Pottery sherds from the early Ottoman era have been found here. The village's historical core, comprising eight buildings arranged around a series of stone-paved courtyards, is not inhabited anymore. Three pillars were found here.

Jibiya was founded after the 16th century. In the spring of 1697, Henry Maundrell noted two "Arab villages," first "Geeb" and then "Selwid," both on the west side of the road on the way south from Nablus to Jerusalem. Edward Robinson identified these two villages as Jibiya and Silwad.

In 1838 Jibia was noted as a Muslim village in the Beni Zaid district, north of Jerusalem.

In 1863 Victor Guérin noted it as a small village, with a shrine, dedicated to a Sheikh Baiezed. An official Ottoman village list from about 1870, listed Dschibija as having 12 houses and a population of 39, though the population count included men, only.

In 1882 the PEF's Survey of Western Palestine (SWP) described Jibia as "a small village on high ground, with olives below."

In 1896 the population of Dschibja was estimated to be about 84 persons.

=== British Mandate era ===
In the 1922 census of Palestine conducted by the British Mandate authorities, Jebia had a population of 62 Muslims, increasing slightly in the 1931 census to 63, in 17 houses.

In 1945 statistics, the population was 90, all Muslims, while the total land area was 1,666 dunams, according to an official land and population survey. Of this, 100 were plantations and irrigable land, 815 for cereals, while 4 dunams were classified as built-up areas.

=== Jordanian era ===
In the wake of the 1948 Arab–Israeli War, and after the 1949 Armistice Agreements, Jibiya came under Jordanian rule.

=== Post-1967 ===
Since the Six-Day War in 1967, Jibiya has been under Israeli occupation.

After the 1995 accords, 51.4% of village land is defined as Area B land, while the remaining 48.6% is defined as Area C. Israel has confiscated land from Jibiya in order to construct Israeli bypass roads 4 and 566, to Israeli settlements.

== Bibliography ==
- Barron, J.B., ed. (1923). Palestine: Report and General Abstracts of the Census of 1922. Government of Palestine.
- Conder, C.R.; Kitchener, H.H. (1882). The Survey of Western Palestine: Memoirs of the Topography, Orography, Hydrography, and Archaeology. Vol. 2. London: Committee of the Palestine Exploration Fund.
- Finkelstein, I.; Lederman, Zvi, eds. (1997). Highlands of many cultures. Tel Aviv: Institute of Archaeology of Tel Aviv University Publications Section. ISBN 965-440-007-3.
- Government of Palestine, Department of Statistics (1945). Village Statistics, April, 1945.
- Guérin, V. (1869). Description Géographique Historique et Archéologique de la Palestine (in French). Vol. 1: Judee, pt. 3. Paris: L'Imprimerie Nationale.
- Hadawi, S. (1970). Village Statistics of 1945: A Classification of Land and Area ownership in Palestine. Palestine Liberation Organization Research Center.
- Hartmann, M. (1883). "Die Ortschaftenliste des Liwa Jerusalem in dem türkischen Staatskalender für Syrien auf das Jahr 1288 der Flucht (1871)". Zeitschrift des Deutschen Palästina-Vereins. 6: 102–149.
- Kampffmeyer, Georg (1893). "Alte Namen im heutigen Palästina und Syrien". Zeitschrift des Deutschen Palästina-Vereins. 16: 1 -71. (p. 30)
- Maundrell, H. (1703). A Journey from Aleppo to Jerusalem: At Easter, A. D. 1697. Oxford: Printed at the Theatre.
- Mills, E., ed. (1932). Census of Palestine 1931. Population of Villages, Towns and Administrative Areas. Jerusalem: Government of Palestine.
- Palmer, E.H. (1881). The Survey of Western Palestine: Arabic and English Name Lists Collected During the Survey by Lieutenants Conder and Kitchener, R. E. Transliterated and Explained by E.H. Palmer. Committee of the Palestine Exploration Fund.
- Robinson, E.; Smith, E. (1841). Biblical Researches in Palestine, Mount Sinai and Arabia Petraea: A Journal of Travels in the year 1838. Vol. 3. Boston: Crocker & Brewster.
- Röhricht, R. (1887). "Studien zur mittelalterlichen Geographie und Topographie Syriens". Zeitschrift des Deutschen Palästina-Vereins. 10: 195–344.
- Schick, C. (1896). "Zur Einwohnerzahl des Bezirks Jerusalem". Zeitschrift des Deutschen Palästina-Vereins. 19: 120–127.
- Socin, A. (1879). "Alphabetisches Verzeichniss von Ortschaften des Paschalik Jerusalem". Zeitschrift des Deutschen Palästina-Vereins. 2: 135–163.
