= Palestine Book Award =

Literary award for English-language books about Palestine

- Official logo
- Awarded for: English-language books about Palestine
- Presented by: Middle East Monitor
- First award: 2012
- Website: www.palestinebookawards.com

The Palestine Book Award is an annual literary award presented by Middle East Monitor for English-language books about Palestine. Established in 2012, the award honors books across a range of genres by writers, scholars, translators, and artists whose work focuses on Palestinian history, society, politics, and culture.

== Winners ==
Year	Author(s)	Title	Ref
2012	Jen Marlowe, Sami Al Jundi	The Hour of Sunlight	
2012	Sara Roy	Hamas and Civil Society in Gaza: Engaging the Islamist Social Sector	
2012	Ben White	Palestinians in Israel: Segregation, Discrimination and Democracy	
2013	Penny Johnson, Raja Shehadeh	Seeking Palestine: New Palestinian Writing on Exile and Home	
2013	Rashid Khalidi	Brokers of Deceit: How the US had undermined peace in the Middle East	
2014	Salim Tamari, Issam Nassar	The Storyteller of Jerusalem: The Life and Times of Wasif Jawhariyyeh, 1904-1948	
2014	Diana Allan	Refugees of Revolution: Experiences of Exile	
2014	Ali Abunimah	The Battle for Justice in Palestine	
2015	Elias Sanbar	The Palestinians: Photographs of a Land and its People from 1839 to the Present Day	
2015	Lena Jayyusi	Jerusalem Interrupted: Modernity and Colonial Transformation	
2015	Jean-Pierre Filiu	Gaza: A History	
2016	Lorenzo Kamel	Imperial Perceptions: British influence and power in late Ottoman times	
2016	Yasir Suleiman	Being Palestinian: Personal Reflections on Palestinian Identity in the Diaspora	
2016	Jehan Bseiso, Ramzy Baroud, Samah Sabawi	I Remember My Name	
2016	Anaheed Al-Hardan	Palestinians in Syria: Nakba Memories of Shattered Communities	
2017	Ilan Pappe	The Biggest Prison on Earth: A History of the Occupied Territories	
2017	Samia Halaby	Drawing the Kafr Qasem Massacre	
2017	Laila Parsons	The Commander: Fawzi Al-Qawuqji and the fight for Arab Independence 1914-1948	
2017	Bjorn Brenner	Gaza under Hamas: From Islamic Democracy to Islamist Governance	
2017	Ella Shohat	On the Arab-Jew, Palestine, and other displacements	
2018	Salim Tamari	The Great War and the Remaking of Palestine	
2018	Maha Nassar	Brothers Apart: Palestinian citizens of Israel and the Arab world	
2018	Colin Anderson	Balfour in the Dock: J.M.N. Jeffries & the Case for the Prosecution	
2018	Reja-e Busailah	In the Land of My Birth: A Palestinian Boyhood	
2019	Ghassan Zaqtan	Where the Bird Disappeared	
2019	Nabil Anani	Palestine, Land and People	
2019	Andrew Ross	Stone Men: The Palestinians who built Israel	
2019	Noura Erakat	Justice for Some: Law and the Question of Palestine	
2019	Isabella Hammad	The Parisian	
2020	Kamal Boullata, Dr. Finbarr Barry Flood	There Where You Are Not	
2020	Nathalie Handal	Life in a Country Album	
2020	Rashid Khalidi	The Hundred Years' War on Palestine: A History of Settler Colonialism and Resistance, 1917–2017	
2020	Susan Abulhawa	Against the Loveless World	
2021	Sonia Nimr, Marcia Lynx Qualey	Wondrous Journeys in Strange Lands	
2021	Erik Skare	A history of Palestinian Islamic Jihad: Faith, awareness, and revolution in the middle east	
2021	Marc Lamont Hill, Mitchell Plitnick	Except for Palestine: The limits of progressive politics	
2021	Timothy Brennan	Places of Mind: A life of Edward Said	
2022	Heba Hayek	Sambac Beneath Unlikely Skies	
2022	Lynn Welchman	Al-Haq: A Global History of the First Palestinian Human Rights Organization	
2022	Mohammad Sabaaneh	Power born of dreams: my story is palestine	
2022	Stephen Sheehi, Lara Sheehi	Psychoanalysis under occupation: practicing resistance in Palestine	
2022	Ashjan Ajour	Reclaiming Humanity in Palestinian Hunger Strikes: Revolutionary Subjectivity and Decolonizing the Body	
2022	Saree Makdsi	Tolerance is a Wasteland: Palestine and the Culture of Denial	
2022	Mosab Abu Toha	Things You May Find Hidden in My Ear: Poems from Gaza	
2023	Ibrahim Muhawi, Hussein Barghouthi	Among the Almond Trees: A Palestinian Memoir	
2023	Nadim Bawalsa	Transnational Palestine: Migration and the Right of Return before 1948	
2023	Tahrir Hamdi	Imagining Palestine: Cultures of Exile and National Identity	
2023	Dareen Tatour	I Sing From the Window of Exile	
2023	Dena Takruri, Ahed Tamimi	They Called Me a Lioness: A Palestinian Girl's Fight for Freedom	
2024	Lisa Bhungalia	Elastic Empire: Refashioning War through Aid in Palestine	
2024	Sandra Barrilaro, Teresa Aranguren	Against Erasure: A Photographic Memory of Palestine Before the Nakba	
2024	Alan Morrison, Atef Alshaer	Out of Gaza: New Palestinian Poetry	
2024	Khadijeh Habashneh	Knights of Cinema: The Story of the Palestine Film Unit	
2024	Amanda Najib	Lana Makes Purple Pizza: A Palestinian Food Tale	
2024	Ghassan Kanafani, Hazem Jamjoum	The Revolution of 1936–1939 in Palestine	
2025	Nasser Abourahme	The Time Beneath the Concrete: Palestine Between Camp and Colony	
2025	Maya Abu Al-Hayyat, Hazem Jamjoum	No One Knows Their Blood Type	
2025	Refaat Alareer	If I Must Die	
2025	Mohammad Tarbush	My Palestine: An Impossible Exile	
2025	Sarah Aziza	The Hollow Half: A Memoir of Bodies and Borders	
2025	Pankaj Mishra	The World After Gaza	
2025	Mohammed el-Kurd	Perfect Victims and the Politics of Appeal	
2025	Omar El Akkad	One Day, Everyone Will Have Always Been Against This	
