= Among the Almond Trees =

2022 memoir

- Author: Hussein Barghuthi
- Genre: Memoir
- Publisher: Seagull Books
- Publication date: 2022
- ISBN: 9780857428967

Among the Almond Trees: A Palestinian Memoir is a memoir written by Hussein Barghouthi (1954 – 2002) and translated into English by Ibrahim Muhawi. It was posthumously published in Arabic in 2004, and the English version was published in 2022. It was a 2023 winner of the Palestine Book Awards and has been widely reviewed.

== Synopsis ==
During the Second Intifada, Barghouthi returns to Palestine after thirty years of living as an expatriate to receive treatment for his terminal lymphoma. As he wanders through his former homeland, he is troubled by the changes brought to the area by Israeli occupation.
