= Imagining Palestine =

2022 book by Tahrir Hamdi

- Author: Tahrir Hamdi
- Language: English
- Genre: History
- Publisher: Bloomsbury Publishing
- Publication date: November 17, 2022
- Awards: Palestine Book Award
- ISBN: 978-1-78831-340-7

Imagining Palestine: Cultures of Exile and National Identity is a 2022 book by Tahrir Hamdi, a professor of Decolonial Studies at Arab Open University. It was a 2023 winner of the Counter Current Award category by Palestine Book Award and has been widely reviewed.
