= Kobar =

- Place

Arabic transcription(s)
  - Arabic: كوبر
  - Latin: Kaubar (official)
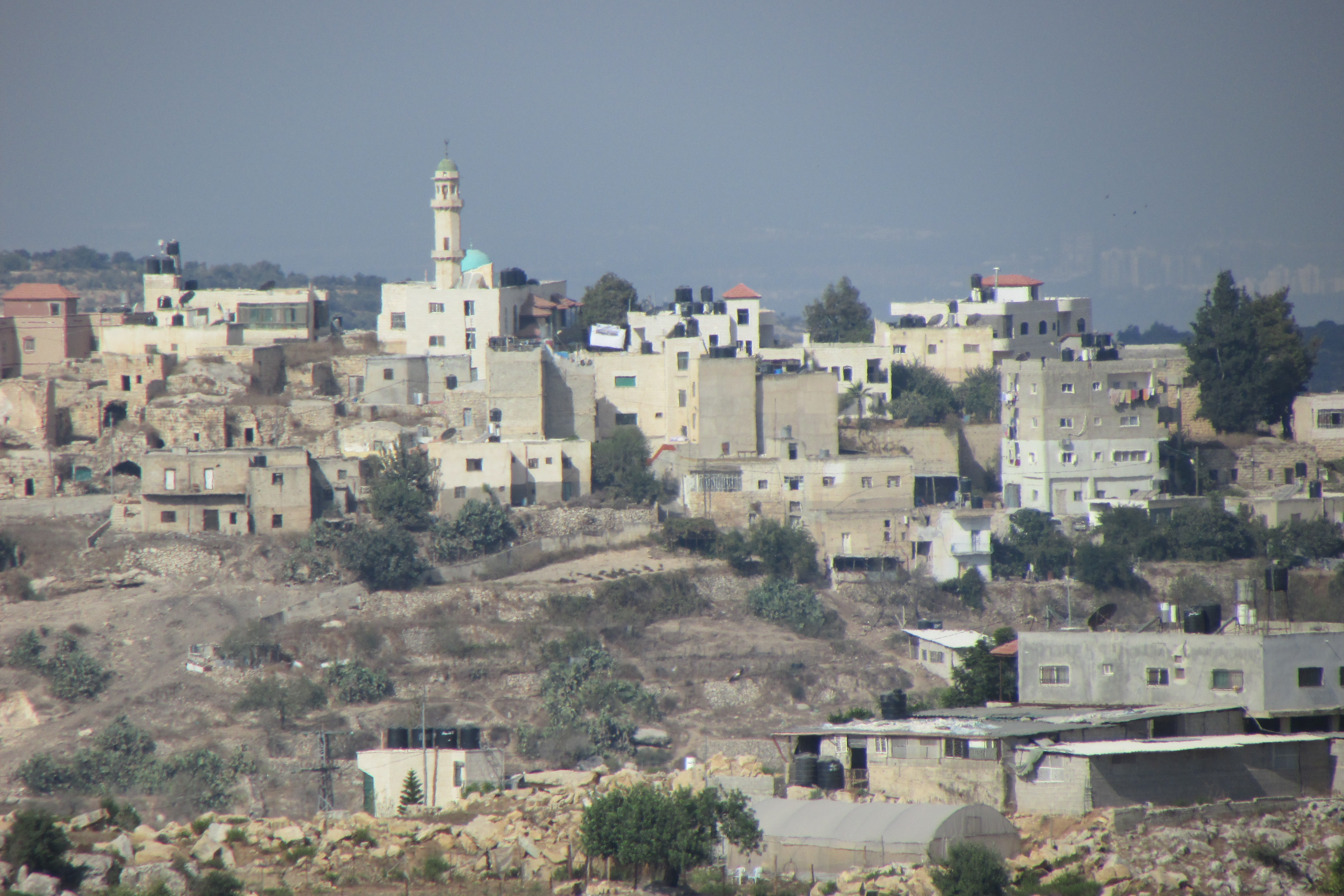
- Kobar Village

- Kobar Location in the State of Palestine Kobar Location in the West Bank
- Coordinates: 31°59′20″N 35°09′33″E
- Palestine grid: 165/155
- State: State of Palestine
- Governorate: Ramallah and al-Bireh

Area
  - Total: 9.7 km^{2} (3.7 sq mi)
- Elevation: 670 m (2,200 ft)

Population (2017)
  - Total: 4,320
- Name meaning: Kubar, personal name

Kobar (Arabic: كوبر) is a Palestinian village in the Ramallah and al-Bireh Governorate of the State of Palestine, in the northern West Bank. Kobar is located at an altitude of 670 meters (2,200 ft) above sea level with a mean annual rainfall of 669.8 mm. The average annual temperature is 16 °C and the average annual humidity is approximately 61%.

Since 1996, Kobar has been governed by a village council which is currently administrated by 11 members appointed by the Palestinian National Authority. There are two further employees working in the council; the village council owns a permanent headquarters and is included within a Joint Services Council for neighboring localities.

== Location ==
Kobar located 10.1 kilometers (6.3 mi) north of Ramallah. It is bordered by Burham to the east, Jibiya and Umm Safa to the north, al-Ittihad to the west, and al-Zaitounah and Bir Zeit to the south.

== History ==
According to the Kobar Village Council, the name "Kobar" means "the place where the gypsum was" on account of it once containing abundant gypsum deposits.

Potsherds from the Iron Age, Persian/Hellenistic, Byzantine, Crusader/Ayyubid and Mamluk periods have been found in the village. The oldest sherds were found on the north and south slopes of the village, while Byzantine sherds were found on the west side.

=== Ottoman era ===
Kobar, like the rest of Palestine, was incorporated into the Ottoman Empire in 1517, and in the census of 1596, the village was located in the Nahiya of Quds of the Liwa of Quds. The population was 31 households, all Muslim. They paid a fixed tax-rate of 33,3% on wheat, barley, vineyards, fruit trees, occasional revenues, goats and/or beehives; a total of 4,000 akçe. Potsherds from the early Ottoman period has also been found here.

In 1838, it was noted as Kubar, a Muslim village in the Bani Zeid district, north of Jerusalem.

In 1863 the French explorer Victor Guérin visited the village. He noted it had 600 inhabitants, and a mosque dedicated to a Sheikh Ahmed. An Ottoman village list of about 1870 showed Kobar with a population of 220, in 48 houses, though the population count included men, only.

In 1882, the PEF's Survey of Western Palestine (SWP) described Kobar as a "small village on a hill-top, with rock-cut tombs, and a tank, surrounded by olives."

In 1896 the population of Kubar was estimated to be about 444 persons.

=== British Mandate era ===
In the 1922 census of Palestine conducted by the British Mandate authorities, Kubar had a population of 447; 444 Muslims and 3 Christians where the Christians were all Orthodox. This had increased by the time of the 1931 census to 546, all Muslim, in 122 houses.

In 1922, Tawfiq Canaan documented local traditions linking two springs to spirits. 'En el-Qubbeh was believed to be the dwelling place of es-sitt Zenab, who reportedly inflicted consequences on any unclean woman approaching the spring, resulting in permanent loss of menstruation or the death of one of her children. Another spring, 'en esh-Sharqiyeh, was said to be home to es-sitt Fattumeh, who was observed engaging in prayer at the site.

In the 1945 statistics the population was 610, all Muslims, while the total land area was 9,678 dunams, according to an official land and population survey. Of this, 3,512 were allocated for plantations and irrigable land, 1,434 for cereals, while 33 dunams were classified as built-up areas.

=== Jordanian era ===
In the wake of the 1948 Arab–Israeli War, and after the 1949 Armistice Agreements, Kobar came under Jordanian rule.

The Jordanian census of 1961 found 934 inhabitants in Kaubar.

=== 1967-present ===
Since the Six-Day War in 1967, Kobar has been under Israeli occupation.

After the 1995 accords, 53.7% of village land belongs to Area B, while the remaining 46.3% is Area C.

In 2008, the preacher at the local mosque in Kobar, Majed Barghouti, 44, died while in detention. His relatives alleged that he had been tortured.

== Notable people from Kobar ==
- Fadwa Barghouti
- Marwan Barghouti
- Hussein Barghouthi (1954 – 2002)

== Twin towns ==
- Walsall, United Kingdom

== Bibliography ==
- Barron, J. B., ed. (1923). Palestine: Report and General Abstracts of the Census of 1922. Government of Palestine.
- Conder, C.R.; Kitchener, H.H. (1882). The Survey of Western Palestine: Memoirs of the Topography, Orography, Hydrography, and Archaeology. Vol. 2. London: Committee of the Palestine Exploration Fund.
- Finkelstein, I.; Lederman, Zvi, eds. (1997). Highlands of many cultures. Tel Aviv: Institute of Archaeology of Tel Aviv University Publications Section. ISBN 965-440-007-3.
- Government of Jordan, Department of Statistics (1964). First Census of Population and Housing. Volume I: Final Tables; General Characteristics of the Population (PDF).
- Government of Palestine, Department of Statistics (1945). Village Statistics, April, 1945.
- Guérin, V. (1869). Description Géographique Historique et Archéologique de la Palestine (in French). Vol. 1: Judee, pt. 3. Paris: L'Imprimerie Nationale.
- Hadawi, S. (1970). Village Statistics of 1945: A Classification of Land and Area ownership in Palestine. Palestine Liberation Organization Research Center.
- Hartmann, M. (1883). "Die Ortschaftenliste des Liwa Jerusalem in dem türkischen Staatskalender für Syrien auf das Jahr 1288 der Flucht (1871)". Zeitschrift des Deutschen Palästina-Vereins. 6: 102–149.
- Hütteroth, W.-D.; Abdulfattah, K. (1977). Historical Geography of Palestine, Transjordan and Southern Syria in the Late 16th Century. Erlanger Geographische Arbeiten, Sonderband 5. Erlangen, Germany: Vorstand der Fränkischen Geographischen Gesellschaft. ISBN 3-920405-41-2.
- Mills, E., ed. (1932). Census of Palestine 1931. Population of Villages, Towns and Administrative Areas. Jerusalem: Government of Palestine.
- Palmer, E.H. (1881). The Survey of Western Palestine: Arabic and English Name Lists Collected During the Survey by Lieutenants Conder and Kitchener, R. E. Transliterated and Explained by E.H. Palmer. Committee of the Palestine Exploration Fund.
- Robinson, E.; Smith, E. (1841). Biblical Researches in Palestine, Mount Sinai and Arabia Petraea: A Journal of Travels in the year 1838. Vol. 3. Boston: Crocker & Brewster.
- Schick, C. (1896). "Zur Einwohnerzahl des Bezirks Jerusalem". Zeitschrift des Deutschen Palästina-Vereins. 19: 120–127.
- Socin, A. (1879). "Alphabetisches Verzeichniss von Ortschaften des Paschalik Jerusalem". Zeitschrift des Deutschen Palästina-Vereins. 2: 135–163.
