= Muna el-Kurd =

Palestinian activist (born 1998)

- منى الكرد
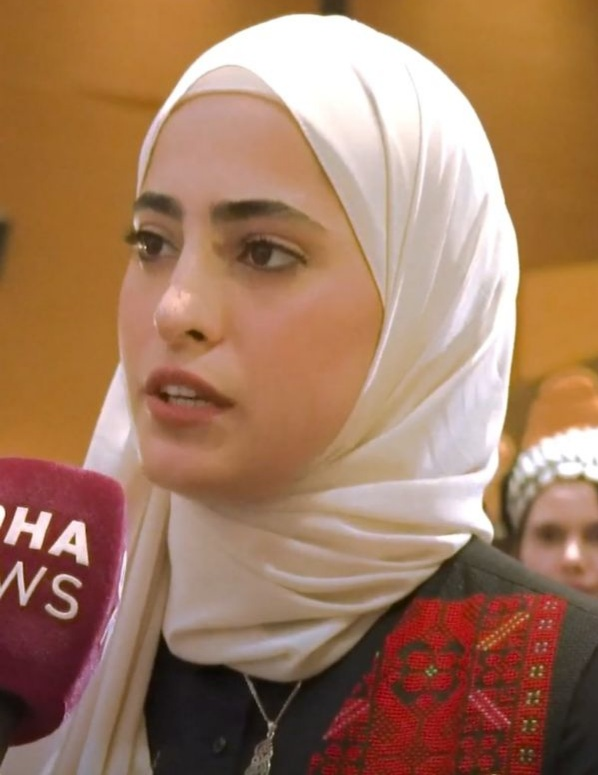
- Muna el-Kurd in 2022
- Born: 15 May 1998 (age 28); Sheikh Jarrah, Israeli-occupied East Jerusalem, Palestine
- Education: Birzeit University
- Known for: Palestinian activism
- Relatives: Mohammed el-Kurd (twin brother)

Muna el-Kurd (Arabic: منى الكرد; born 15 May 1998) is a Palestinian activist based in the neighbourhood of Sheikh Jarrah in East Jerusalem. Alongside her twin brother, Mohammed el-Kurd, she drew international attention for her involvement in the Sheikh Jarrah controversy, which served as a key trigger for the 2021 Israel–Palestine crisis. She has regularly protested Israel's eviction of Palestinians in East Jerusalem, and gained prominence for her activism on a variety of social media channels.

== Early life ==
El-Kurd was born into a family of Palestinian Muslims in the neighbourhood of Sheikh Jarrah, East Jerusalem, Israeli-occupied West Bank on 15 May 1998. From a young age, she and her family experienced threats of eviction from their home by Israeli authorities.

In 2009, part of her family's home in Sheikh Jarrah was seized by Israeli settlers.

== 2021 Israel–Palestine crisis ==
In 2021, Muna's family was among 11 other Palestinian families who were threatened with eviction from their home per a decision by an Israeli court (see Sheikh Jarrah controversy). They were given 30 days to leave the home, but the family's lawyer filed an appeal with the district court. Tensions between Israeli authorities and Palestinians in East Jerusalem eventually triggered the 2021 Israel–Palestine crisis.

On 6 June 2021, Muna and her brother Mohammed were arrested by Israeli police; they were later released on the same day after being detained for several hours.

During this period, both Muna and Mohammed were named on TIME 100.

In May 2021, a video of el-Kurd confronting an Israeli settler, whom she accused of attempting to take over her family's home, went viral on social media. In the video, the settler responds, "If I don't steal your home, someone else will steal it." The exchange received widespread international attention and circulated widely online. During that same time period, her Instagram account was briefly suspended.

In 2022, she told Al Jazeera Mubasher that the Sheikh Jarrah campaign is still being covered by the media but that it had lost momentum, and called for continuing the social media hashtag campaign.
