= Rifqa (book) =

2021 poetry collection by Mohammed el-Kurd

- Book cover of Rifqa
- Author: Mohammed el-Kurd
- Language: English
- Genre: Poetry
- Publisher: Haymarket Books
- Publication date: 12 October 2021
- Publication place: United States
- Pages: 100
- ISBN: 978-1-64259-586-4

Rifqa is a 2021 poetry collection by Palestinian writer and poet Mohammed el-Kurd, published by Haymarket Books. The book includes a foreword by Aja Monet. Named for el-Kurd's grandmother Rifqa El-Kurd, the collection addresses family memory, dispossession, and political life in Sheikh Jarrah and East Jerusalem.

The collection was shortlisted for the Felix Dennis Prize for Best First Collection at the 2022 Forward Prizes for Poetry.

== Reception ==
In the Los Angeles Review of Books, Summer Farah wrote that Rifqa explores "the ways colonialism alters our navigation of time and space".

The Daily Star reviewer stated "As beautiful and touching as it is, Rifqa retains its edge all the way to the end."
