= Palestine Center =

The Palestine Center (previously called the Center for Policy Analysis on Palestine until 2002) is an independent educational program based in Foggy Bottom, Washington, D.C. Their focus is on the Israeli–Palestinian conflict and other Middle Eastern issues.

== Founding ==
The Palestine Center was set up in 1991 as an educational component of The Jerusalem Fund for Education and Community Development. The Fund is a 501(c)(3) non-profit grant-making organization operating in the United States. Its founders include the late professors Hisham Sharabi of Georgetown University and Samih Farsoun of American University. Sharabi was a founder of the Center for Contemporary Arab Studies at Georgetown University. The founding director of the Center was Muhammad Hallaj who held the post until 1994. The current executive director is Zeina Azzam.

== Purpose ==
The center analyzes relations between the United States and the Middle East with a focus on the Palestinian issue. The center studies specific U.S. policies, publishes reports, briefing, and analysis, and serves as a venue for Palestinian and Arab scholars.

The center also houses the Hisham Sharabi Memorial Library, one of the largest Palestine-centered collections in the United States. The center employs fellows to conduct policy research. It published extensive online audio archives of its events going back to the early 1990s, a blog and a YouTube page to document its on-site events.

== Publications ==
The center has been referenced by diverse news media from the Turkish Weekly to the Washington Times and Christian Science Monitor.

== Events ==
The Palestine Center holds weekly events and often invites distinguished speakers. Speakers at the Palestine Center have included former Israeli Knesset member Azmi Bishara, Palestinian diplomat Afif Safieh, Clovis Maksoud, Ambassador Nabil Fahmy, Egyptian Ambassador to the United States, Hanan Ashrawi, Palestinian Prime Minister Salam Fayyad, and John Mearsheimer, among others.

== See also ==
- The Jerusalem Fund
