= Clovis Maksoud =

American diplomat (1926–2016)

- كلوفيس مقصود
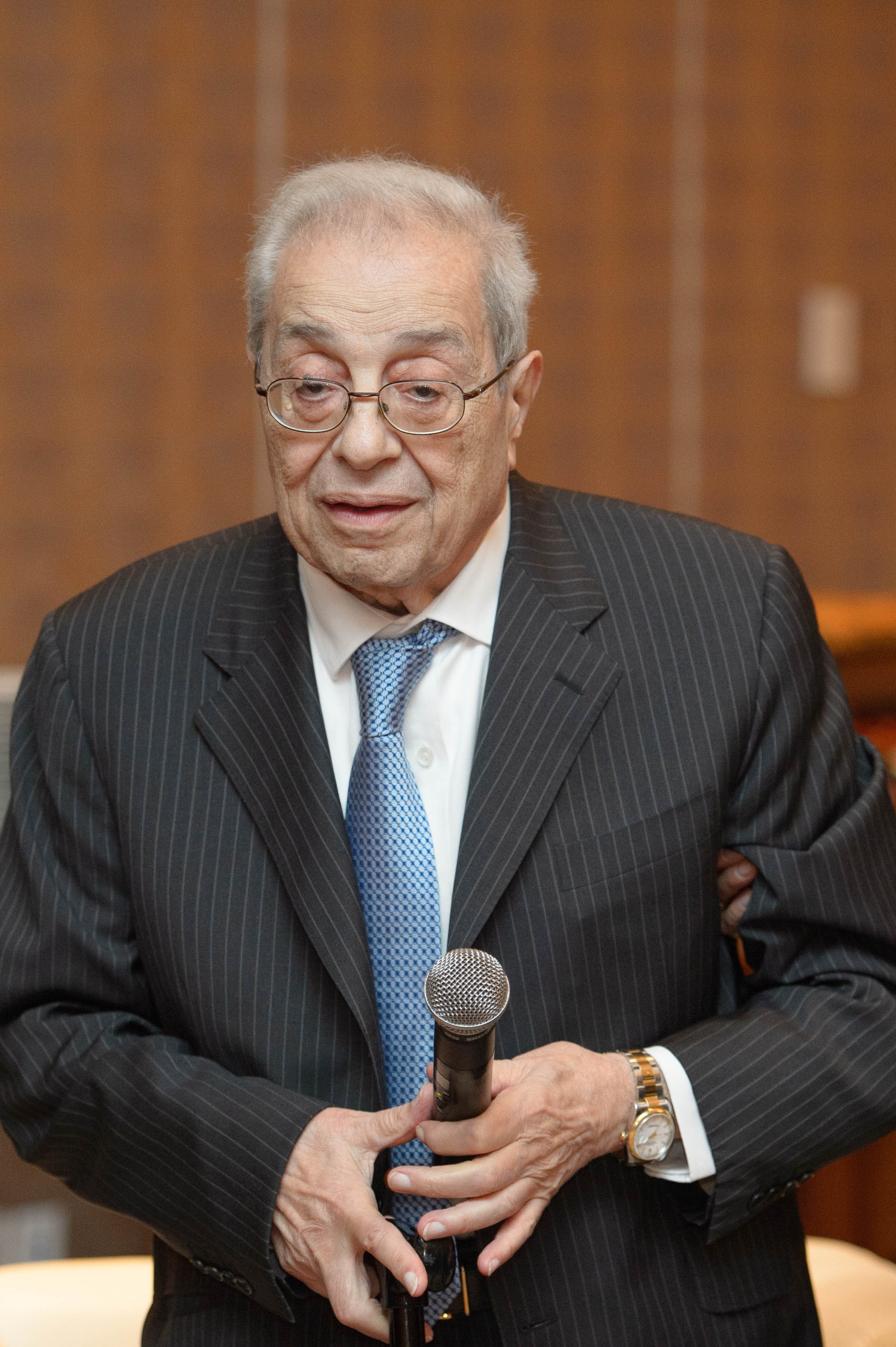
- Maksoud in 2015
- Born: December 17, 1926; Bristow, Oklahoma, U.S.
- Died: May 15, 2016 (aged 89); Washington, D.C., U.S.
- Education: American University of Beirut, George Washington University, Oxford University
- Occupations: Ambassador of the Arab League, Senior editor of Al-Ahram, Professor of International Relations and Director of the Center for the Global South at American University in Washington, DC
- Notable work: The Meaning of Non Alignment, The Meaning of Non Alignment, Reflections on Afro-Asianism, The Arab Image
- Movement: Arab Unity, Global South, Non-Aligned Movement, Palestinian Rights

Clovis Maksoud (December 17, 1926 – May 15, 2016) was an American diplomat and journalist. He served as Ambassador of the Arab League to India from 1961 through 1966, to the United Nations from 1979 through 1990 and at the same time to the United States. He worked with presidents John F. Kennedy, Lyndon B. Johnson, Jimmy Carter, Ronald Reagan and George H. W. Bush.

Besides from being an ambassador, Maksoud was the senior editor of Al-Ahram. He also served as professor of international relations and director of the Center for the Global South at American University in Washington, D.C..

== Early life ==
Clovis Maksoud was born in Bristow, Oklahoma, on December 17, 1926, to Lebanese parents. His mother was an Orthodox Christian, and his father, a Maronite Catholic, had settled in Oklahoma working in the petroleum exploration industry. The family moved to Beirut when Maksoud was a teenager in high school.

At the start of World War II, in 1939, Maksoud was enrolled in Beirut's renowned International School of Choueifat, which attracted Arab and international students from all over the world. This international and pan-Arab intellectual environment, along with the school's specialised teaching staff, nurtured his formative ideals.

== Education ==
In 1944 at the age of 18 Clovis Maksoud enrolled at the American University of Beirut (AUB), to study political science and economics. Lebanon was on its way to gaining independence from France. During his years at AUB he was greatly influenced by the forward-thinking intellectual and pan-Arab ideas of Professor Constantin Zureiq.

"In my student days, towering academic figures such as Constantin Zureiq and Charles Malik espoused competing narratives that sought to define the meaning and national purpose of the Arab region this University serves." Maksoud said in his Founder's Day speech at AUB in 2003.

After graduating from AUB in 1948, he travelled to study law in the United States where he received his JD from George Washington University in Washington, D.C. In 1951, Associate Supreme Court Justice William O. Douglas introduced him to his first wife Rosemary Curry. They were married in 1951 and had one child, Elizabeth.

Clovis Maksoud went on to earn his post-graduate degree after that at Oxford University, UK. At Oxford, Clovis spent a great deal of time at London's Hyde Park Corner's Speakers' Corner honing his debating skills.

During debates at the Oxford Union Clovis Maksoud was known to have used extremely long sentences to make his point which led to someone in the audience eventually shouting "Full Stop." causing the audience to applaud. But this did not stop Clovis; "Sir," Clovis retorted, "you did not take into account all of the commas I used during my speech."

== Arab League Ambassador ==
=== India 1961 – 1966 ===
Clovis Maksoud's writings and pan-Arab ideals led to his nomination in 1961 as Ambassador of the Arab League to India and Southeast Asia, where he had the reputation of being the most influential foreign diplomat.

The Cold War between the United States and the Soviet Union had led India's first Prime Minister Nehru to adopt a strategy of "Non-Alignment" in order to maintain relations with both superpowers. During this period Clovis Maksoud was passionate advocate of Nehru's Non-Aligned Movement, writing his essay entitled Clovis Maksoud on Non- Alignment published by The League of Arab States Mission in New Delhi.

Maksoud's efforts and writings on behalf Non-Alignment caught the attention of Prime Minister, Nehru, as well as Indira Gandhi, who became prime minister in 1966 and for the duration of his term, Clovis Maksoud played a pivotal role in establishing closer relations between India and the Arab World.

In response to the growing tensions of the Cold War, India stood as an outspoken advocate of the interests of the Non-Aligned countries and showed its unequivocal support of Arab causes and Palestinian rights and Arab countries became essential elements of Nehru's Non-Aligned bloc.

=== Ambassador to the United States and the United Nations ===
The October War of 1973 between Israel and its neighbours led to the Arab Oil Embargo that resulted in cutting oil exports to the West. In response to the American public's outcry the Arab League dispatched Clovis Maksoud as the League's Special Envoy to the United States to explain the Arab viewpoint to Americans.

As the League's representative he embarked on innumerable journeys across the US addressing civic organizations, think tanks, church groups and universities. "Our job is to convey the Arab consensus to American policy makers and opinion makers." he said to the Washington Report on Middle East Affair.

In 1974 Clovis Maksoud met Hala Salaam (the niece of late Lebanese Prime Minister Saeb Salam) who was to be his second wife, at a conference in Beirut. The two helped found the American-Arab Anti-Discrimination Committee and served on the board of directors of many educational, advocacy and charitable nonprofits including; Association of Arab-American University Graduates, Friends of Sabeel- North America and Committee for the Preservation of Palestinian Heritage.

Clovis was elevated to the post of League ambassador to the US and United Nations in 1979. In his role as Ambassador to the United States he was faced with the challenge of dispelling a deeply established negative Arab stereotype in the American media. Clovis Maksoud met this challenge by publishing his work entitled "The Arab Image" and by penning numerous articles, op-eds and essays contributing over the years of his service to a better cultural understanding of Arabs and their perspective in the United States .

At the United Nations Clovis Maksoud became the Vice Chair of the United Nations Development Programme (UNDP) advisory board on Arab Human Development Reports (a series of in depth United Nations reports on the status of development in the Arab World), bringing coherence to Arab diplomacy at the United Nations, as well as giving voice to the concerns and interests of the Global South as a whole.

As he saw it the United Nations was chartered to allow dialogue and diplomacy between all its members and was against attempts by the United States, NATO or the Security Council to exert undue influence on the organization. In an interview with the Australian Broadcasting Corporation he said

the United Nations would have to be in charge ... or the North would be in charge of managing chaos – and that is exactly what the United Nations is supposed to be empowered to avert and to avoid. And that is why I'm talking about a mechanism of preventive diplomacy and preventive action which not only tries to avoid the disputes from becoming conflicts, but also to address the root causes of poverty, environmental degradation, disenfranchisement of people, etcetera. I think that is the crucial and central objective of the United Nations in the new post cold war period.

Despite years of hard work his faith in a united Arab position was shaken by the devastating 1990 Gulf War. After coming to grips with a disappointing lack of pan-Arab consensus and a vacuum in pan-Arab leadership, Clovis Maksoud did what was previously unimaginable. On August 15, 1990, he resigned from the Arab League.

== Journalism and political writing ==
Clovis Maksoud had a parallel career as a journalist, editor and political writer. From 1967–1979 Clovis Maksoud became Senior Editor of Egypt's Al Ahram, and subsequently Chief Editor at the Lebanese Weekly Al-Nahar. Over his years of service, Clovis Maksoud contributed a body of writing on Middle East affairs, by penning articles in the press, publishing essays, booklets, and compiling his lectures and speeches into published works.

Clovis Maksoud is also the author of many books on the Middle East and the global south, among them: "The Meaning of Non Alignment", "The Crisis of the Arab Left", "Reflections on Afro-Asianism", and "The Arab Image".

== Academic career ==
Clovis Maksoud's Academic career centered around subjects of International Law, Middle East Studies, International Relations and the Global South. His decades of experience in diplomacy gave him a unique and practical approach to his work. Maksoud was professor of international relations in the School for International Service, international law professor at the College of Law and the founding director of the Center for the Global South at American University. Clovis Maksoud also helped establish the Center for Contemporary Arab Studies at Georgetown University in the late 1970s and served as a member of the Center's Board of Advisors. In 2005, the Clovis and Hala Salaam Maksoud Chair in Arab Studies was inaugurated at the University to a packed audience.

== Death ==
Maksoud died on May 15, 2016, at a hospital in Washington, D.C., from a cerebral hemorrhage at the age of 89.
