= Muhammad Hallaj =

Palestinian academic and writer (1932–2017)

- Born: 1932; Qalqilya, Mandatory Palestine
- Died: 2017 (aged 84–85)
- Education: University of Florida
- Occupations

Academic work
- Discipline: Political sciences
- Institutions: Jacksonville University; University of Jordan; Birzeit University

Muhammad Hallaj (1932–2017) was a Palestinian scholar and writer on Palestinian affairs. He could not pursue his academic career in Palestine in the 1980s and settled in the US. He served as a member of the Palestinian National Council.

== Early life and education ==
Hallaj was born in Qalqilya, Mandatory Palestine, in 1932. He attended a high school in Jaffa. Following the Nakba the family left their hometown. He obtained his Ph.D. in political sciences from the University of Florida in 1966.

== Career and activities ==
Following his graduation Hallaj joined the Jacksonville University, Florida, as a lecturer and taught there until 1970. Then he taught at the University of Jordan in Amman from 1970 to 1975. During his tenure Hallaj served as dean of social sciences. Next he joined Birzeit University on the West Bank in 1975 and became a full professor. He was appointed vice president of Birzeit University and then was named as the first director of the Council for Higher Education in the West Bank and Gaza. He taught at Birzeit University until 1981 when he went to the US for a study visit at Harvard University. After the end of his study visit in 1983 he returned to Birzeit University, but the Israeli authorities did not grant him a work permit. Therefore, he had to leave Palestine and settled in the US.

Hallaj was the editor of a magazine entitled Palestine Perspectives between 1983 and 1991. He was the director of the Center for Policy Analysis on Palestine from 1991 to 1994. He was made a member of the Palestinian National Council in 1991. He headed Palestinian delegation during the multilateral talks on refugees which had been initiated after the Madrid Conference in 1991.

Hallaj was a board member of various Palestinian organizations such as the commissioners of the Palestinian Independent Commission for Citizens’ Rights.

=== Work ===
Hallaj published many articles on Palestinian affairs. He was among the contributors of the 1988 book entitled Blaming the Victims: Spurious Scholarship and the Palestinian Question edited by Edward Said and Christopher Hitchens.

== Death ==
Hallaj died in 2017.
