= Transnational Palestine =

2022 Palestinian history book

Transnational Palestine: Migration and the Right of Return Before 1948
- Author: Nadim Bawalsa
- Publisher: Stanford University Press
- Publication date: 2022
- ISBN: 9781503632264

Transnational Palestine: Migration and the Right of Return Before 1948 is a 2022 book by Nadim Bawalsa. It was a 2023 winner of the Palestine Book Award and has been widely reviewed.

== Content ==
- Author's Note
- Prologue
- Introduction
1. Palestinians Settle the American Mahjar
2. The Tradition of Transnational "Pro-Palestinia" Activism
3. The 1925 Palestinian Citizenship Order-In-Council
4. Mexico's Palestinian Take on Britain's Interwar Empire
5. The Chilean Arabic Press and the Story of Palestinos-Chilenos
6. Bringing the Right of Return Home to Palestine
- Conclusion
- Epilogue
- Acknowledgements
- Notes
- Bibliography
- Index
