= Burham, Ramallah =

Burham
- Local Development Committee

Arabic transcription(s)
  - Arabic: بُرهام
  - Latin: Boorhem (official); Kh. Miriam (unofficial)
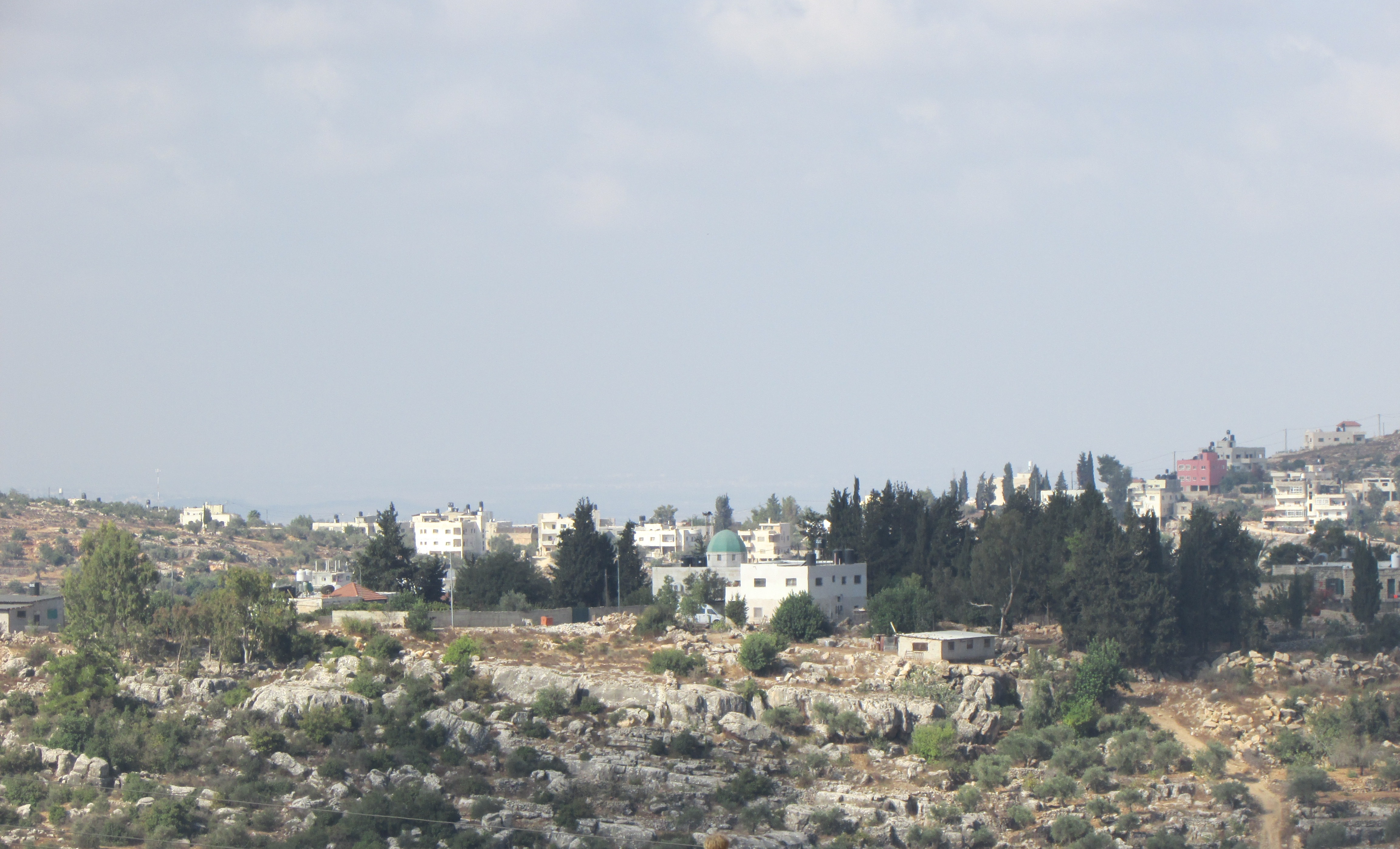
- Burham mosque

- Location of Burham within Palestine
- Coordinates: 31°59′21″N 35°10′29″E
- Palestine grid: 166/155
- State: State of Palestine
- Governorate: Ramallah and al-Bireh

Government
  - Type: Local Development Committee

Area
  - Total: 1.6 km^{2} (0.62 sq mi)

Population (2017)
  - Total: 583
  - Density: 360/km^{2} (940/sq mi)
- Name meaning: Khurbet Burheim; The ruin of Burheim, from personal name

Burham (Arabic: بُرهام) is a Palestinian village in the Ramallah and al-Bireh Governorate located twelve kilometers north of Ramallah. The largest nearby town is Bir Zeit located to the southeast. The average elevation of Burham is 680 meters above sea level. The village was established during the Byzantine Empire rule over Palestine.

== Location ==
Burham is located 9.8 km north of Ramallah. It is bordered by 'Atara and Bir Zeit to the east, Umm Safa and Jibiya to the north, Kobar to the west, and Bir Zeit and Kobar to the south.

== History ==
Sherds from the Roman, Byzantine and Mamluk eras have been found here.

=== Ottoman era ===
Sherds from the early Ottoman era have also been found. Under the name of Dayr Burhan it was listed in the 1538-1539 census.

In 1838 it was noted as a Muslim village in the Bani Zeid administrative region.

In 1863 Victor Guérin noted that it was divided into three parts. He further noted "an ancient rock-cut tomb consisting of a rough sepulchral chamber containing only one koka, and preceded by a vestibule. Here and there are old foundations built of badly quarried stones. There are also remains, probably of an ancient church."

An official Ottoman village list of about 1870 showed that it had a total of 14 houses and a population of 69, though the population count included men, only.

In 1882, the PEF's Survey of Western Palestine (SWP) described Khurbet Burheim as: "A few houses on high ground." They further noted that it was "A ruined village, with caves. It is still inhabited by a few peasants."

=== British Mandate era ===
In the 1922 census of Palestine conducted by the British Mandate authorities, Burham had a population of 74 Muslims, increasing at the time of the 1931 census to 122, still all Muslim, in 26 houses.

In the 1945 statistics, the population was 150 Muslims, while the total land area was 1,589 dunams, according to an official land and population survey. Of this, 191 were for plantations and irrigable land, 787 for cereals, while 6 dunams were classified as built-up areas.

=== Jordanian era ===
In the wake of the 1948 Arab–Israeli War, and after the 1949 Armistice Agreements, Burham came under Jordanian rule.

The Jordanian census of 1961 found 167 inhabitants.

=== Post-1967 ===
Since the Six-Day War in 1967, Burham has been under Israeli occupation.

After the 1995 accords, 98% of village land is defined as Area B land, while the remaining 2% is defined as Area C.

According to the Palestinian Central Bureau of Statistics, Burham had a population of 565 in mid-year 2006. In the 2007 census by the PCBS, there were 616 people living in the town. By 2017, there were 583 residents.

== See also ==
- Naseer Aruri

== Bibliography ==
- Barron, J.B., ed. (1923). Palestine: Report and General Abstracts of the Census of 1922. Government of Palestine.
- Conder, C.R.; Kitchener, H.H. (1882). The Survey of Western Palestine: Memoirs of the Topography, Orography, Hydrography, and Archaeology. Vol. 2. London: Committee of the Palestine Exploration Fund.
- Finkelstein, I.; Lederman, Zvi, eds. (1997). Highlands of many cultures. Tel Aviv: Institute of Archaeology of Tel Aviv University Publications Section. ISBN 965-440-007-3.
- Government of Jordan, Department of Statistics (1964). First Census of Population and Housing. Volume I: Final Tables; General Characteristics of the Population (PDF).
- Government of Palestine, Department of Statistics (1945). Village Statistics, April, 1945.
- Guérin, V. (1869). Description Géographique Historique et Archéologique de la Palestine (in French). Vol. 1: Judee, pt. 3. Paris: L'Imprimerie Nationale.
- Hadawi, S. (1970). Village Statistics of 1945: A Classification of Land and Area ownership in Palestine. Palestine Liberation Organization Research Center.
- Hartmann, M. (1883). "Die Ortschaftenliste des Liwa Jerusalem in dem türkischen Staatskalender für Syrien auf das Jahr 1288 der Flucht (1871)". Zeitschrift des Deutschen Palästina-Vereins. 6: 102–149.
- Mills, E., ed. (1932). Census of Palestine 1931. Population of Villages, Towns and Administrative Areas. Jerusalem: Government of Palestine.
- Palmer, E.H. (1881). The Survey of Western Palestine: Arabic and English Name Lists Collected During the Survey by Lieutenants Conder and Kitchener, R. E. Transliterated and Explained by E.H. Palmer. Committee of the Palestine Exploration Fund.
- Robinson, E.; Smith, E. (1841). Biblical Researches in Palestine, Mount Sinai and Arabia Petraea: A Journal of Travels in the year 1838. Vol. 3. Boston: Crocker & Brewster.
- Socin, A. (1879). "Alphabetisches Verzeichniss von Ortschaften des Paschalik Jerusalem". Zeitschrift des Deutschen Palästina-Vereins. 2: 135–163.
- Toledano, E. (1984). "The Sanjaq of Jerusalem in the Sixteenth Century: Aspects of Topography and Population". Archivum Ottomanicum. 9: 279–319.
