= Mohammed el-Kurd =

Palestinian activist and writer (born 1998)

- محمد الكرد
- El-Kurd in 2024
- Born: 15 May 1998 (age 28); Sheikh Jarrah, Israeli-occupied East Jerusalem, Palestine
- Education: Savannah College of Art and Design (BFA); Brooklyn College (MFA)
- Occupations: Writer; poet; journalist
- Known for: Palestinian activism
- Notable work: Rifqa (2021); Perfect Victims and the Politics of Appeal (2025)
- Relatives: Muna el-Kurd (twin sister)
- Website: www.mohammedelkurd.com

Mohammed el-Kurd (Arabic: محمد الكرد; born 15 May 1998) is a Palestinian writer, poet, and journalist who gained prominence for his descriptions of Palestinians' lives under occupation in East Jerusalem and the rest of the West Bank. El-Kurd has referred to evictions as a form of ethnic cleansing, and has also accused Israel of imposing apartheid-style laws and regulations on Palestinians in the occupied territories.

== Biography ==
=== Early life and education ===
El-Kurd was born on 15 May 1998 into a Palestinian Muslim family in Sheikh Jarrah, East Jerusalem, in the Israeli-occupied West Bank. In 2009, when he was 11, part of his family's home in Sheikh Jarrah was taken over by Israeli settlers. The episode was the subject of the 2013 documentary film My Neighbourhood, directed by Julia Bacha and Rebekah Wingert-Jabi.

El-Kurd wrote poetry as a teenager, sometimes in both Arabic and English, and performed in Sheikh Jarrah and elsewhere in Jerusalem.

El-Kurd earned a Bachelor of Fine Arts degree from the Savannah College of Art and Design and a Master of Fine Arts degree in creative writing from Brooklyn College. In 2018, while studying writing at the Savannah College, he released Radical Blankets, which Mondoweiss described as a poetry and multimedia magazine. In 2021, while pursuing graduate studies at Brooklyn College, he returned to East Jerusalem to protest Israel's eviction of Palestinians from their homes in East Jerusalem, including in Sheikh Jarrah.

=== Return to East Jerusalem (2021) ===
Since his return to the Israeli-occupied West Bank during the Sheikh Jarrah controversy, El-Kurd has documented and spoken against Palestinian displacement in East Jerusalem. He and his twin sister, Muna el-Kurd, used social media to draw attention to Israeli policies in East Jerusalem. A 2021 article in Tripodos said Muna's posts were usually in Arabic, while Mohammed often posted in English for a Western audience.

On 6 June 2021, Mohammed and Muna were both detained by Israel Police; they were released later that same day after being held for several hours. During the 2021 Israel–Palestine crisis, Mohammed appeared on American television channels including CNN, MSNBC, and CBSN.

In 2021, Mohammed and Muna were named to the Time 100 list of the world's most influential people.

== Career ==
In addition to his work in poetry and creative nonfiction, El-Kurd has worked as a journalist and editor. He is The Nation's first Palestine correspondent. In 2023, Mondoweiss announced that he had joined its staff as culture editor; the publication later listed him as editor-at-large on its masthead.

His debut poetry collection, Rifqa, was published by Haymarket Books in 2021. Reviews and critical essays have described Rifqa as concerned with family memory, dispossession, occupation, resistance, and humor.

In 2019, El-Kurd and oud musician Clarissa Bitar released the spoken-word album Bellydancing on Wounds through Rosewater Records. His nonfiction book Perfect Victims: And the Politics of Appeal was published by Haymarket Books in 2025. Reviews described the book as examining dehumanization and the expectation that Palestinians appeal to outside audiences to prove their humanity.

El-Kurd has cited Aimé Césaire, Frantz Fanon, Rashid Hussein, Amal Dunqul, and Suheir Hammad among writers who have influenced him and whom he admires.

When El-Kurd was a teenager he wrote a poem titled "Rifqa", which was published in the eponymous 2021 book. It contains a line in which "they" (i.e., Israelis) "harvest organs of the martyred, [and] feed their warriors our own." The poem contains a footnote referring the reader to the 2009 Aftonbladet Israel controversy about Israeli doctors harvesting organs from Palestinian and some Israeli corpses in the 1990's without the permission of their families. El-Kurd said, "It's a metaphor, it's not something I literally believe. I'm just now realizing that they actually think, or are pretending to think for purposes of exaggeration, that I actually believe Israelis eat Palestinian organs.... At first it was comical, but now it seems very sinister. The line is about the practice of withholding Palestinian bodies and [...] exploiting the bodies in ways that have been documented and are widely discussed."

== Views ==
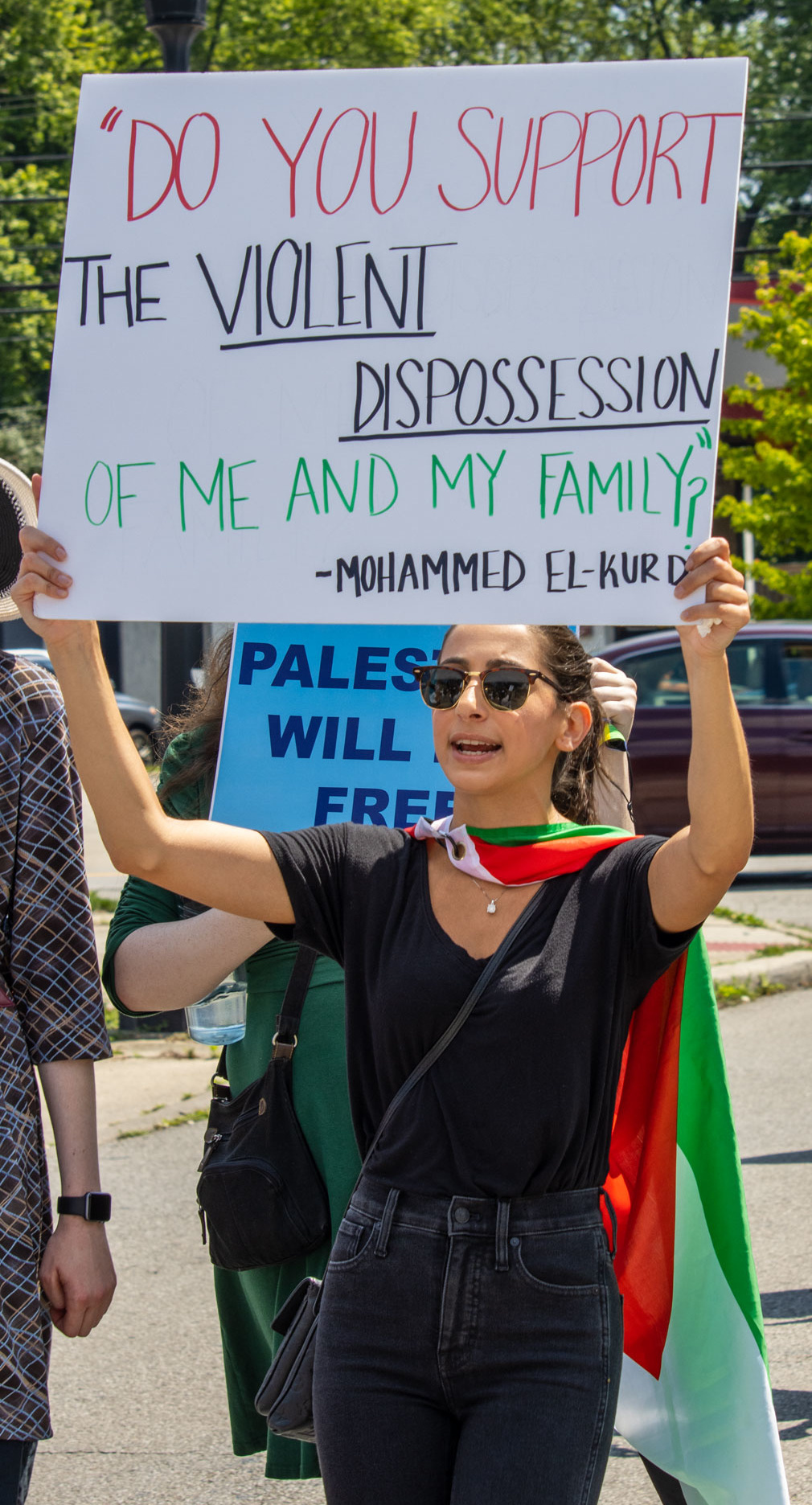
Pro-Palestinian protester in San Francisco quoting el-Kurd

El-Kurd is noted for "unapologetically" speaking out against Israeli oppression of Palestinians in East Jerusalem, the West Bank, and Gaza, both about the specific, immediate threat to, and constant stress for families like his of eviction, but also all forms of oppression.

El-Kurd blames the "Zionist project" – and multinational political, diplomatic, and economic support for it – for the displacement, subjugation, and statelessness of the Palestinian people.

Regarding the Gaza war, El-Kurd has stated that focusing narrowly on the October 7 attacks overlooks its foundational causes such as the Israeli and Egyptian blockade of the Gaza Strip.

El-Kurd speaks of a Palestinian reality in East Jerusalem where oppression (evictions, demolitions) is hierarchical and normalized, muzzling and gaslighting Palestinian residents. He personally has questioned whether he would have the energy to fight back against oppression, as is characteristic of Palestinians, sometimes being "exhausted" from lifelong oppression. Breaking through and deciding to fight back, he described, was a moment of understanding the psychological warfare as a turning point to the realization that he was worthy (of housing, in this case) at the most basic level. He describe that the collective protests against expulsion in his home neighborhood of Sheikh Jarrah showed unprecedented unity among the different groups, overcoming the delusions that separation had created.

El-Kurd argues that activists should move beyond messages that are generally perceived as respectable in Western society and media, to deliver fully truthful messages about Palestine-Israel and other conflicts. Respectability, he states, is dressing a certain way, expressing healing a certain way, speaking only on certain topics with "respectable" vocabulary and qualifiers.

El-Kurd has stated that the first step in achieving reparations of changing realities on the ground is to get people to understand "the correct" narrative and "on the right side of history", a grassroots narrative from Palestinian "street culture", not a narrative co-opted by Palestinians who are the elite or who have ties to U.S., Israeli institutions or the Palestinian Authority, which he says is corrupt and a "co-pilot of the Israeli occupation".

El-Kurd challenges Western media that regularly ask Palestinian guests to denounce violent protests or attacks by Hamas and other groups, characterizing these questions as inciting, bigoted and disrespectful. To one such question from a CNN anchor, El-Kurd responded: "Do you support the violent dispossession of me and my family?" He said that the incident was an example that Palestinians will no longer accept "racism and misrepresentation" on Western television, and that, like him, they "really don't take shit" any longer.

El-Kurd made a speech on 14 January 2024 at the Palestine Solidarity Campaign's "March for Palestine" demonstration in London in which he said "Zionism is apartheid, it's genocide, it's murder. It's a racist ideology, rooted in settler expansion and racist domination. We must root it out of the world. We must de-Zionize because Zionism is a death cult". Concluding the speech, El-Kurd stated "Our day will come, but we must not be complacent. Our day will come but we must normalize massacres as the status-quo", which some interpreted as a reference to the 2023 Hamas-led attack on Israel. El-Kurd later said he had misspoken and had meant to say "not normalise massacres as the status-quo". According to the Jewish News Syndicate, the speech was "widely denounced as antisemitic incitement".

== Works ==
- El-Kurd, Mohammed (2021). Rifqa. Haymarket Books. ISBN 9781642595864.
- Foreword to Aranguren, Teresa, and Sandra Barrilaro, eds. (2024). Against Erasure: A Photographic Memory of Palestine Before the Nakba. Haymarket Books. ISBN 9781642599800.
- El-Kurd, Mohammed (2025). Perfect Victims: And the Politics of Appeal. Haymarket Books. ISBN 9798888903155.
