= Timothy Brennan =

Cultural theorist (born 1953)

Timothy Andres Brennan (born 1953) is a cultural theorist, professor of literature, public speaker, and activist. He is known for his work on American imperialism, the political role of intellectuals, Afro-Latin music, and the problem of the "human" and the humanities in an age of technoscience.

He is an early theorist of cosmopolitanism and an oppositional voice within postcolonial studies who has challenged the prevailing trends of postmodernism and poststructuralist theory. He has also carried on, while adapting, the intellectual leads of Edward Said, including the radical force of humanism, the poetic sociology of thinkers like Ibn Khaldun, Cola di Rienzo, and Giambattista Vico, and the generative role of Marxism in anti-colonial thought and practice.

Two of his best-known books are Wars of Position: The Cultural Politics of Left and Right (2006) and Places of Mind: A Life of Edward Said (2021), which won the Palestine Book Award in 2021.

== Education and career ==
Brennan earned his BA from the University of Wisconsin–Madison in 1976 (where he studied with the social historian, Harvey Goldberg) and his PhD from Columbia University in 1988, when he worked as an international news feature broadcaster for WKCR-FM, and debated Dinesh D’Souza on public television. Between his undergraduate and graduate studies, he lived on New York's Lower East Side working with political prisoner support groups, immigrant communities in the Bronx, and covering the last great miners’ strike in the late 1970s in West Virginia as a freelance reporter.

Until 2020, the Samuel Russell Chair in the Humanities at the University of Minnesota, Brennan has taught English, world literature and intellectual history at a number of institutions, including the Humboldt University, Cornell University, and the University of Michigan.

His widely cited essay, "The National Longing for Form" was published in 1990 – a defense of small-nation nationalism in an era of supposed cosmopolitanism, "a term that has often acted as cover for U.S. military adventures abroad".

In several books over the next two decades – especially, At Home in the World (1997) and Wars of Position (2006) – his career was defined by two main themes: an account of the saturation of popular culture, art, and elite discussion by imperial attitudes honed in a Cold War common sense; and the abdication of academic intellectuals, and the rise of political right, as a result of the former's dismissal of the state, its rejection of organizing, and its distrust of agency.

This depoliticization, he argued in Borrowed Light (2014), is of a piece with a prevailing posthumanism: "to attack the maverick secularity of humanism – where critical thought is primarily found – is not to push back against conservative European legacies (as it is widely seen) but to align oneself with humanism's traditional antagonists: religious absolutism, Church censorship, and reactionary modernism."

== Selected works ==
=== Selected essays ===
- "Digital Humanities Bust," The Chronicle Review, Chronicle of Higher Education, October 16, 2017 (Print: Oct 20, 2017, 64:08).
- "Humanism’s Other Story," For Humanism: Explorations in Theory and Politics, David Alderson and Robert Spencer, eds. (Pluto, 2017), 1–23.
- "Subaltern Stakes," New Left Review 89 (Spring, 2015), 1–32
- "The Free Impersonality of Bourgeois Spirit," Special issue of Biography on "Corporate Personhood," (2014), 1–45.
- "Crude Wars" (co-authored with Keya Ganguly), South Atlantic Quarterly 105:1 (Winter 2006), 24–37.
- "Postcolonial Studies Between the European Wars: An Intellectual History," Marxism, Modernity and Postcolonial Studies (Cambridge UP, Winter 2002), 185–203. (Translated into French, Swedish).
- "The National Longing for Form," Nation and Narration (London: Routledge, 1990), 44–70.

=== Books ===
- Places of Mind, A Life of Edward Said (NY: Farrar Straus & Giroux; London: Bloomsbury, 2021) (Translated into Arabic, Chinese, Spanish, Turkish).
- Borrowed Light: Vico, Hegel and the Colonies Vol. I (Stanford UP, 2014). (Translated into Korean).
- Secular Devotion: Afro-Latin Music and Imperial Jazz (Verso, 2008).
- Empire in Different Colors (Empire Különböz Színekben) and Another Finger Exercise (Újabb Ujjgyakorlat) (with Szacsva y Pál) (Frankfurt am Main: Revolver, 2007).
- Wars of Position: The Cultural Politics of Left and Right (Columbia UP, 2006).
- Music in Cuba—Introduced, Edited, and Co-translated Alejo Carpentier's La música en Cuba (University of Minnesota Press, 2001).
- At Home in the World: Cosmopolitanism Now (Cambridge: Harvard UP, 1997).
- Salman Rushdie and the Third World: Myths of the Nation (London: Macmillan, 1989).

=== (Co)-edited volumes ===
- Intellectual Labor (with Keya Ganguly), Special Issue of South Atlantic Quarterly 108:2 (Spring 2009).
- The Writing of Black Britain, Special Issue of The Literary Review (Fall 1990).
- Narratives of Colonial Resistance, Special Issue of Modern Fiction Studies, 35, 1 (Spring 1989).

=== Selected interviews ===
- "Imaginative Geography" for Odyssey, a daily talk show of ideas, Chicago Public Radio and Public Radio International, WBEZ-FM, 12:00–1:00, March 11, 2005.
- Interviewed by Philipp Felsch, Deutschlandradio "Kultur Kompressor" Program on the state of left theory, March 4, 2016.
- "The Theory that Lives On: A Counter-Intuitive History" (Interviewed by Francescomaria Tedesco), Minnesota Review 78 (2012), 62–82 (8548 words).
- Interviewed by Michele Catanzaro of the Spanish newspaper El Periódico on the Barcelona City Government's digital humanities project on Catalan genealogies, "Bienvenidos a la máquina del tiempo," Oct. 26, 2019
- Interviewed by Kaleem Hawa, The Nation, March 5, 2021
- Interviewed on BBC Radio 3, March 11, 2021 – "Free Thinking" Roundtable (Rana Mitter, host; with Pankaj Mishra, Ahdaf Soueif, Marin Warner)

=== Books about ===
- Poetic Histories in World Literature: Essays in the Anti-Imperialist Tradition, Asher Ghaffar, ed. (Routledge, 2018).
