= Perfect Victims =

Palestinian book by Mohammed el-Kurd

Perfect Victims and the Politics of Appeal
- Cover art
- Author: Mohammed el-Kurd
- Publisher: Haymarket Books
- Publication date: February 11, 2025
- Pages: 256
- ISBN: 979-8-88890-316-2

Perfect Victims and the Politics of Appeal is a 2025 non-fiction book by the Palestinian writer and poet Mohammed el-Kurd in which the author analyzes the strategy of emphasizing Palestinian victimhood to appeal to a Western, liberal audience. The book was met with positive reviews, it was on multiple bestseller lists, and it won the 2025 Palestine Book Award.

== Background ==
Mohammed el-Kurd is a Palestinian poet, writer, and activist from the neighborhood of Sheikh Jarrah in East Jerusalem.

In February 2023, el-Kurd addressed the concept of perfect victims in his lecture "On 'Perfect Victims' and the Politics of Appeal" delivered as the Edward Said Memorial Lecture at Princeton University. In November 2023, the lecture was adapted and published as "The Right to Speak for Ourselves" in The Nation. The book Perfect Victims and the Politics of Appeal was published by Haymarket Books on February 11, 2025.

El-Kurd has cited as influential in his writing of the book Aimé Césaire, Frantz Fanon, Rashid Hussein, Amal Dunqul, and Suheir Hammad, as well as figures of the Black radical tradition including Toni Morrison, Audre Lorde, Sylvia Wynter, Saidiya Hartman, and George Jackson.

== Summary ==
=== Central claim ===
In the book, he critically interrogates the strategy of emphasizing Palestinian victimhood in order to make the Palestinian cause palatable to a liberal audience that professes to care about human rights. In a discussion of the book, El-Kurd said:

I begin with "Even if". Even if there were weapons hidden under al-Shifa Hospital, it should not be bombed. Even if Palestinian fighters hid among civilians, they still have the right to resist. Even if Palestinians harbored resentment towards Jews, they still should not be under occupation. Even if… even if… even if… There is nothing Palestinians could do that would justify Zionist colonialism. The goal is to shift the frame, to make it clear that Zionism is the problem, not Palestinian behavior.
The "Even if" argument is about refusing to play defense. It’s about refusing to answer to Zionist moral tests, refusing to plead our case in a way that conforms to colonial expectations. It’s a rejection of the performance Palestinians are forced into—the constant demand that we prove ourselves worthy of liberation.

== Reception ==
Perfect Victims is Mohammed el-Kurd's first non-fiction book. It debuted at 9th on The New York Times Best Seller for paperback nonfiction the week of March 2, 2025. It was also awarded the 2025 Palestine Book Award.

According to Jackie Wang in Jewish Currents, "By emphasizing victimhood as the condition for sympathy, he argues, this strategy grants the moral authority of those in power—those who preside over the world structured by colonial brutality—and requires Palestinians to maintain a posture of pitiable powerlessness". Historian Robin D. G. Kelley described it as "a new Discourse on Colonialism for the twenty-first century".

Sim Kern, a writer, activist, and prominent book reviewer on social media, noted that despite being a New York Times bestseller, el-Kurd's book Perfect Victims "hasn't gotten any major newspaper reviews, any trade reviews", attributing it to "active suppression".
