= Center for Contemporary Arab Studies =

Academic institute in Washington, US

The Center for Contemporary Arab Studies at Georgetown University in Washington, D.C., United States, is an academic center "distinguished by its emphasis on study of the contemporary Arab world and its rigorous Arabic language training." Part of the Edmund A. Walsh School of Foreign Service, CCAS was founded in 1975. Scholars Hanna Batatu and Hisham Sharabi were part of its founding.

== Funding ==
The initial money for the center came from the U.S. government, Saudi Arabia, the United Arab Emirates, and Oman; shortly afterwards, Libya donated $750,000 for to endow a chair that went to historian Hisham Sharabai, a close associate of Yasser Arafat. In total, the CCAS received more than $4 million from Arab governments in the first five years of its existence. A further $275,000 of the center's founding donations came from American corporations with business ties to the Middle East. A further $50,000 had been donated by the government of Iraq, but this was returned by the university's president at the time, Rev. Timothy J. Healy; in response, Sharabi, a member of the CCAS, called him a "Jesuit Zionist."

The center is funded by the university, by grants, and by private donors including the governments of Saudi Arabia, the UAE, Oman, and Libya, as well as corporations with business interests in the Middle East; more than two-thirds of the center's money comes from Arab governments. Since 1997, CCAS has served as the core of Georgetown University's National Resource Center on the Middle East and North Africa, funded by a Title VI grant from the US Department of Education. In addition, the center hosts endowed chairs from Oman, Kuwait, and the United Arab Emirates, along with a chair in Human Development.

In 2019, Congressman Denver Riggleman wrote to the Department of Education seeking a review of federal funding for the Center for Contemporary Arab Studies; he also raised questions about the possible conflicts of interests arising from the presence of officials of foreign governments on its board of advisors. Its board of advisors includes representatives of the governments of Egypt, Jordan, Qatar, Oman, Saudi Arabia, and the UAE.

== Programs and leadership ==
In December 1977, the CCAS opened enrollment for its first MA in Arab Studies which began in the fall of 1978 with 8 students.

CCAS offers an MA degree in Arab Studies as well as certificates in Arab Studies to undergraduates and graduate students. CCAS' MA program also has joint degrees with the Law School. MA in Arab Studies students can also get certificates in a number of other programs including International Business Diplomacy and Refugee and Humanitarian Emergencies.

Previous directors of the CCAS have included Michael C. Hudson, Barbara Stowasser, Ibrahim Ibrahim, and Rochelle Davis. The current director is Fida Adely.

The CCAS houses the Arab Studies Journal (ASJ), which is a peer-reviewed research publication based on Arab and Middle East Studies from the Arab Studies Institute (ASI). The journal is published twice a year.
