= The Jerusalem Fund =

US-based non-profit organization

The Jerusalem Fund for Education and Community Development is a 501(c)(3) non-profit organization based in Foggy Bottom, Washington, D.C. It focuses on educational and humanitarian work on behalf of Palestinians, particularly those living in the Occupied Territories and surrounding refugee camps. Since its formation in 1977, The Jerusalem Fund has invested in the potential of the Palestinian people through community development initiatives and direct financial assistance to primary health and basic education projects, grassroots and civil society initiatives, and educational programs in the United States about Palestine and the Palestinians. To implement its mission, The Jerusalem Fund maintains four programs: the Palestine Center, Gallery Al-Quds, the Palestine Diabetes Institute, and the Humanitarian Link.

== Board of directors ==
The Jerusalem Fund is composed of nine board members serving on various sub-committees. The three sub-committees are: the executive committee composed of the board chairman, secretary, and treasurer; the Grants and Finance Committee, composed of the board chairman, treasurer, and board members Dr. Mohayya Khilfeh, Dr. Tawfiq Ramadan, Walid Keilani and Dr. Sari Nabulsi; and the Palestine Center Committee composed of the executive committee, board members Dr. Mohayya Khilfeh and George Hishmeh, and noted scholars Dr. Edmund Ghareeb and Dr. Halim Barakat.

== The Humanitarian Link ==
The Humanitarian Link is the charitable wing of The Jerusalem Fund. The Humanitarian Link gives small grants to needy hospitals, schools, orphanages and nongovernmental organizations. According to The Jerusalem Fund website, "Strict reporting requirements and regular visits by Jerusalem Fund staff ensure the proper distribution of funds and project monitoring."

== The Palestine Diabetes Institute ==
The Palestine Diabetes Institute address the growing diabetes epidemic in Palestine through treatment, awareness, and education. It is the first such facility in Palestine.

== Gallery Al-Quds ==
Since 2000, the Gallery Al-Quds has been the sole, full-time area showcase for the exhibition of contemporary art by Arab-American and Arab artists. The Gallery specializes in the work of Palestinian artists, with an additional emphasis on the work of contemporary artists whose art centers on issues of the Arab and Islamic worlds. The gallery exhibits work in a full range of media including painting, sculpture, photography, film, and mixed media.
