= Fatah Revolutionary Council =

Lower House Legislature of Fatah

Revolutionary Council of Fatah المجلس الثوري لحركة فتح al-Majlis al-thawrī li-Ḥarakat Fatḥ
- 2016 Revolutionary Council

Type
- Houses: Upper body Central Committee of Fatah; Advisory body Advisory Council of Fatah; Lower body Revolutionary Council of Fatah
- Seats: 80

Elections
- Last election: 2016
- Next election: TBD

The Fatah Revolutionary Council (FRC) is Fatah’s internal parliamentary body and its second most prominent institution after the Central Committee of Fatah. It consists of approximately 80 members elected from a pool of approximately 1400 party members including civil and military personalities during the Fatah General Congress, from whom another 21 members are also elected for Fatah’s Central Committee. Candidates may only be nominated if they're over the age of 33, and have been full party members for 15 years uninterrupted.

== Sessions ==
According to the internal regulations of the Fatah movement, the Revolutionary Council must meet periodically every three months, where: a) the Secretary-General invites the members to the meeting or,
b) written letter is written by two-thirds of the members to call for a session or,
c) in the event of a request by the Central Committee

== Responsibilities ==
The Fatah Revolutionary Council is tasked with a variety of responsibilities, the most notable of which are to supervise the work of the Central Committee and to approve internal policies and their interpretation. It also replaces vacancies on the Central Committee in the event of death, withdrawal, or expulsion. It also takes on the responsibility of dismissing or freezing members' memberships, whether in the Central Committee or any of the movement's apparatuses. The Revolutionary Council also works to implement Fatah's General Conference decisions, monitor the work of the Central Committee and the movement's conditions in the regions, and oversee the Fatah movement's military affairs, in addition to discussing the Central Committee's decisions and activities. It also interprets the texts of Fatah's internal regulations in accordance with the movement's regulations, elects the head of the movement's court and the members of its committees, and discusses the reports of the General Conference and Revolutionary Council committees.

Fatah's seventh Congress, held in Ramallah in December 2016, elected a new FRC and FCC. This was widely interpreted as Mahmoud Abbas' attempt to tighten his grip on the party by expelling his opponent Mohammed Dahlan and marginalising the popular Fatah figure Marwan Barghouti.

== Membership ==
No.	2026 Eighth Congress	2016 Seventh Congress	2009 Sixth Congress	1988 Fifth Congress
1	Dalal Erekat	Fadwa Barghouti	Amna Kamel Gabriel Suleiman (Amna Gabriel)	Ahmed Ghoneim
2	Fadwa Mohammad Ismail Barghouti	Fatahi Aradat	Samir Hussein Ali Al-Rifai	Ahmed Fawzy Khaled Al-Deek
3	Hassan Othman Hassan Faraj	Amna Suleiman	Abeer Mohammed Salim Al-Wahidi (Abeer Al-Wahidi)	Amin Maqbool
4	Raed Rateb Mahmoud Al-Louzi	Hatem Abdul-Qader	Dalal Abdul-Hafiz Mahmoud Salama	Burhan Nihad Al-Haj Ibrahim Jarar
5	Hanan Khalil Ibrahim Al-Wazir	Ashraf Dabour	Amin Ramzi Darwish Maqbool (Amin Maqbool)	Bakr Abdel Moneim
6	Khawla Dawood Ahmad Al-Azraq	Husam Zumlut	Sabry Mamdouh Saidam (Sabry Saidam)	Jamila Ahmed Khamis Saidam
7	Hussein Jadallah Hussein Hamayel	Jamal Aburrub	Hatem Mohammed Abdul-Qader Eid (Hatem Abdul-Qader)	Rafiq Al-Natsheh
8	Zakaria Ali Hussein Muslih	Majed Fetyani	Bassam Abdullah Yousef Al-Agha (Bassam Al-Agha)	Sami Muslim
9	Moayyad Sha'ban	Jamal Huwail	Jamal Abdul Latif Saleh Al-Shoubaki (Jamal Al-Shoubaki)	Saleem Al-Zarii
10	Akram Rajoub	Akram Rjoub	Fathi Abu Al-Ardat	Salah Al-Taamari
11	Rateb Abdul Latif Abdul Karim Haribat	Younes Amr	Fadwa Al-Barghouti (Umm Al-Qassam)	Abdul Aziz Shaheen
12	Yasser Mahmoud Ali Abu Bakr	Hanna Haylana	Bahaa Misbah Yousef Baalousha	Azzam Al-Ahmad
13	Hani Youssef Khalil Ja'ara	Saeb Nazif	Younes Murshid Younes Amr	Fayez Aref Ahmed Zidane
14	Issam Adel Aref Al-Qudoumi	Hasan Faraj	Osama Abdul Sattar Musa Al-Fara (Osama Al-Fara)	Fakhri Shaqoura
15	Ramal Youssef Saeed Abu Ain	Salam Zereie	Abdullah Abdullah	Marwan Al-Barghouti
16	Maher Mahmoud Amer Nammoura	Bahaa Baalousha	Fahmi Al-Zaarir	Nahed Al-Rayes
17	Riyad Hassan Ahmad Al-Ainin	Rabeeh Khundaqji	Ibrahim Shaker Mahmoud Khreisha	Najla Yassin
18	Mowaffaq Mahmoud Abdul Karim Sahweel	Refaat Shanaa	Jamal Muhammad Hussein Nazzal (Jamal Nazzal)	Hikmat Hashem Lotfi Zaid
19	Amin Atta Allah Mohammad Shouman	Moayyad Sha’ban	Barakat Al-Farra	
20	Ayed Mohammad Hassan Oweimer	Ahmad Assaf	Jamal Shati (Abu Khaled)	
21	Diaa Zakaria Shaker Al-Agha	Iyad Aqraa	Ali Jamil Mustafa Mahna (Bar Association)	
22	Ihab Mahmoud Mohammad Abu Jazar	Isam Abu Baker	Afif Emil Hanna Safiyeh (Afif Safiyeh)	
23	Imad Fahmi Mohammad Omar Kharwat	Fayez Abu Eita	Bilal Abdul Rahim Asaad Azrael (Azrael)	
24	Abdel Fattah Sobhi Mousa Dawla	Bassam Zakarneh	Nayef Sweitat	
25	Luay Youssef Mansi Eida	Khawla Azraq	Saeb Ali Rafiq Nazif (Abu Ali)	
26	Hatem Abdel Qader	Faed Mustafa	Ziad Muhammad Ahmad Abu Ain (Ziad Abu Ain)	
27	Mohammad Youssef Mahmoud Al-Dayeh	Mohammad Horani	Ziad Ahmed Jabr Al-Rajoub (Abu Al-Moatasem)	
28	Ammar Mustafa Ahmad Mardi	Talal Dweikat	Bassam Fouad Saleh Zakarneh (Bassam Zakarneh)	
29	Jamal Huweil	Uri Deves	Sarhan Dweikat	
30	Maisoon Mahmoud Hassan Obeid	Salwa Hudaib	Bakr Mahmoud Ali Abu Bakr	
31	Hatem Shukri Awad Abu Al-Hussein	Ibrahim Masri	Uri Yousef Haim Davis	
32	Salwa Bakr Mohammad Ramadan	Jamal Ahmad	Adly Shaaban Hassan Sadek	
33	Yousef Amjad Youssef Faraj	Jihad Masimi	Musa Abu Zaid	
34	Rafiq Rawajbeh	Abdel-Elah Atira	Kamal Al-Sheikh	
35	Abdel Sattar Zuhair Tawfiq Awad	Mahmoud Damra	Nazmi Arsan Khaled Hazouri	
36	Jamal Abdel Latif Saleh Al-Shoubaki	Rafiq Hussaini	Ismail Abu Shamala (Abu Nidal)	
37	Hamdan Othman Hamdan Barghouti	Majed Helo	Jamal Ishaq Saeed Abu Al-Layl (Jamal Abu Al-Layl)	
38	Ahmad Awad Ali Kmail	Afif Safia	Zuhair Ibrahim Mahmoud Al-Wazir	
39	Fakhri Barghouti	Kefah Abdul-Qader	Abdul Fattah Muhammad Ibrahim Hamayel	
40	Jihad Abdullah Mohammad Al-Masimi	Adnan Gheith	Hafez Omar Mansour Al-Barghouthi	
41	Bassam Fouad Saleh Zakarneh	Ahmad Kmail	Fathi Al-Bahriya (Muhammad Al-Razem)	
42	Areej Ahmad Hussein Masoud	Saleh Ahmad	Jamal Mahmoud Muhammad Al-Darghma	
43	Omar Mohammad Omar Abu Hashiya	Razan Hindia	Salwa Kaid Musa Hadib	
44	Khalil Mahmoud Abu Aram	Ra’ed Radwan	Amal Tawfiq Abdul Hadi Hamad	
45	Tayseer Mohammad Saleh Nasrallah	Feras Jaris	Muhammad Taha Hassan Abu Aliya (Abu Taha)	
46	Ziad Mustafa Salman Shaath	Jamal Nazzal	Raji Al-Najmi	
47	Nasser Abdullah Salim Abu Bakr	Zakaria Zubeidi	Hassan Abdullah Saleh Ishtiwi (Abu Al-Ezz)	
48	Iyad Rafiq Bakr Helles	Mai Keileh	Luay Ali Nafeh Abdo	
49	Jamal Mohammad Hussein Nazzal	Abdul-Munem Hamdan	Hazem Abu Shanab	
50	Ali Mahmoud Abdullah Abu Diak	Jawad Awwad	Jihad Awad Allah Muhammad Abu Zneid	
51	Aisha Saeed Odeh Al-Kurd	Raed Nemer	Haitham Rashid Mahmoud Al-Halabi	
52	Yousef Al-Hilo	Jamal Jaradat	Bilal Hashem Sadiq Al-Natsheh	
53	Bahaa Misbah Youssef Baalousha	Richard Zananizi	Omar Othman Muhammad Al-Haroub (Abu Harb)	
54	Saed Fouad Ahmad Arziqat	Fakhri Bargouti	Khaled Muhammad Ibrahim Abu Asba (Khaled Abu Asba)	
55	Amin Ahmad Bashir Salahat	Wafaa Hab-errih	Dhiyab Ayoush	
56	Razan Mustafa Saeed Hindia	Arij Masoud	Taha Muhammad Mahmoud Abdel Qader (Khaled Aref)	
57	Amna Kamel Gabriel Suleiman	Qadri Abu Baker	Jamal Muhammad Mahmoud Abu Al-Rab (Hitler)	
58	Amal Ahmad Hussein Khalifa	Bassam Walweel	Suleiman Muhammad Suleiman Halas	
59	Ismail Aref Dawood Odeh	Faisal Abu Sharkh	Sister Haitham Arar	
60	Basel Suleiman Amin Al-Bazra	Tayseer Nasrallah	Faisal Abu Shahla	
61	Salwa Hdeib	Zuhair al-Wazeer	Hazem Nasri Awda Qamsieh	
62	Ahmad Atta Ahmad Abu Saltah	Osama Qawasmeh	Ibrahim Shahada Ibrahim Al-Masry (Abu Samer Al-Masry)	
63	Mansour Saleh Mansour Shreim	Abdullah Abu Zaid	Haitham Khaled Al-Hassan	
64	Mutasim Jamal Ahmad Al-Muheisen	Nayef Sweitat	Ashraf Atef Qasim Dabour	
65	Najat Omar Sadiq Abu Bakr	Tayseer Farhat	Hassan Abu Labdeh	
66	Ziad Taha Mohammad Matar	Iyad Safi	Siham Thabet Yousef Thabet (Siham Thabet Thabet)	
67	Anton George Anton Salman	Bassam al-Agha	Tawfiq Muhammad Mabrouk Abu Khousa	
68	Imad Khaled Youssef Al-Agha	Omar Hroub	Samir Salim Ahmad Abu Ghazala (Hajj Talal)	
69	Mohammad Abdel Karim Hassan Zawahreh	Saleh Mahmoud	Justice Al-Atira	
70	Mahmoud Awad Tawfiq Damra	Tayseer Salem	Mahmoud Bakr Muhammad Hijazi	
71	Areej Mustafa Mahmoud Odeh	Mohammad Nammoura	Abdul Hakim Amer Melhem Awad (Abdul Hakim Awad)	
72	Adnan Mohammad Hassan Al-Obeiat	Bayan Tabib	Dimitri Diliani	
73	Shafiq Abdel Ati Mohammad Al-Talouli	Ahmad Soboh	Hanan Nakhl Elias Masih	
74	Iyad Ali Hassan Nasr	Kefah Odeh	Bassam Walweel	
75	Issam Mohammad Abdel Qader Qasem	Kholoud Mughrabi	Mazen Ghanem	
76	Fathi Hussein Ali Abu Al-Ardat	Mohammad Lahham	Hassan Arif Abdullah Al-Khatib (Hassan Al-Khatib)	
77	Jihad Ali Mohammad Youssef	Iyad Nasser	Sufyan Othman Abu Zaida	
78	Raed Fayez Abdullah Mteir	Osama Najjar	Alaa Hosni (Rabaia)	
79	Monther Youssef Eid Al-Hayek	Hafez Barghouti	Abdul Hamid Salem Hamad Al-Masry	
80	Wafaa Afif Abdullah Hab Al-Reeh	Mahmoud Wawi	Shami Youssef Muhammad Shami (Shami Al-Shami)	

== Sources ==
- Stern, Moran (2 January 2022). "Factionalisation from Below: The Case of Palestinian Fatah". Civil Wars. 24 (1): 27–72. doi:10.1080/13698249.2022.2015194. ISSN 1369-8249.
- Tuastad, Dag Henrik (2022). "The Palestinian National Movement and the Struggle Within". Routledge Companion to the Israeli-Palestinian Conflict. Routledge. pp. 291–306. ISBN 9780429027376.
