= Imad Barghouthi =

Palestinian astrophysicist and prisoner of conscience (1962–present)

Imad Ahmad Barghouthi (Arabic: عماد أحمد البرغوثي, born 1962) is a Palestinian astrophysicist. He is a member of the Barghouti hamula. Barghouti is presently professor of Theoretical Space Plasma Physics at Al-Quds University, and resides in Beit Rima near Ramallah. A leading researcher in his field, he has authored 42 papers in peer-reviewed scientific journals.

He has been arrested by Israeli authorities on several occasions and, in July 2020, placed without trial under administrative detention. He has of 2021 never been convicted on any charge. Numerous scientists and scholars around the world have demanded his immediate release on several occasions.

In June 2021 he was reported released, after nearly a year in administrative detention.

== Career ==
Barghouthi was born in 1962. After earning a doctorate in physics at Utah State University, he was employed and funded by NASA for a number of projects before taking up positions in Jordan and Saudi Arabia. He started teaching at al-Quds University in 2000 and gives courses on Advanced nuclear theory, Atomic and Molecular physics, the Theory of Electromagnetism and the Theory of relativity.

His research papers, which concentrate on plasmic physics cover several topics ranging from the phenomenon of polar wind and ion outflow, Ionosphere-magnetosphere coupling to Coulomb collisions. He has written several papers on upper atmosphere ionosphere reactions. He has also set forth an hypothesis to explain the way oxygen ions are propagated from the earth's surface into space.

== History of arrests ==
Barghouthi has been arrested by Israel on three occasions and held without charge, a practice commonly used by the Israeli state against Palestinians. Barghouti has also been arrested once by the Palestinian Authority.

=== 2014 ===
During the Israel invasion on Gaza in 2014, at a rally on the 14 August Hamas rally, Barghouthi called on Palestinians to "take up arms to defend their homes". A video of his comments was subsequently uploaded to YouTube. The comments were used to justify his arrest at the time. Palestinian figures after the war stated that of the 2,251 Gaza fatalities during the 51-day conflict 1,462 were civilians. Two months later, in October, he praised Hamas's Izz ad-Din al-Qassam Brigades, called upon Palestinians to resist the occupation and liberate Muslim holy places such as Jerusalem's Al-Aqsa.

Later that year, on 6 December, while he was en route to attending the 11th Arab Conference on Astronomy and Space Sciences (an organization he helped to found,) at the University of Sharjah in the United Arab Emirates, Israeli border authorities arrested him at the Allenby Bridge crossing to Jordan. He was released on 18 January 2015, after the directors of Euroscience addressed a letter of concern to the then Israeli ambassador to France, Yossi Gal, stating that in the absence of public evidence, the group considered his detention as a serious infringement of academic freedom. (Note: Some days earlier, at the same crossing Israeli forces arrested the journalist Omar Nazzal who had been recently appointed director of a television station "Palestine Today" which was declared illegal by Israel in February and had been subject to military raids. Nazzal was on his way to a conference of the European Federation of Journalists in Sarajevo, which protested the incident as did the International Federation of Journalists (Giorgio 2016).) The group also requested that the Israeli government come forth at short notice with information as to where he was being held, his state of health and the reasons for his detention. The nature of the reasons for his detention at this time were, according to Middle East Eye, unknown. In a later interview with the journal Nature, Barghouthi stated that his problems started when he began to express his opposition to the Israeli occupation of the West Bank and when he uploaded on his Facebook profile a picture of himself wearing the green scarf and hat of Hamas.

=== 2016 ===
Barghouthi was re-arrested on 24 April 2016 at an Israeli checkpoint close to the village of Nabi Saleh, as he was travelling home, and held without charges. Eventually he was kept in detention for three months. In early May the army claimed that it had evidence that he "posed a significant security threat" and, as such, thereby warranted being kept under administrative detention. An Israeli court dismissed the case on 26 May for lack of evidence and stated he was to be released on the following Sunday. 29 May Just three days before his release date Israeli military authorities filed charges that he was culpable of incitement and argued he be moved to Ofer Prison. His release order was cancelled and he was subsequently transferred to a facility run by the Shin Bet for further interrogation, and eventually prosecuted for incitement on Facebook.

According to the Palestinian Information Center, at the time there was no statute in Israeli law allowing criminal charges to be laid for what people write online. His lawyer later revealed that the evidence produced in court included the number of "likes" and "shares" his Facebook posts received. (Note: According to Samar Francis, director of the Palestinian Prisoner Rights NGO Addameer, "Prosecutors use the numbers of 'likes' and 'shares' of specified posts, while failing to connect these posts or these individuals, to acts of violence. The trend is an alarming one, in which the right to freedom of expression is severely obstructed." (The Independent 2016)) He was sentenced in September to six months in prison by an Israeli military court for incitement on Facebook and fined $500 (6,000 shekels), becoming one of 150 Palestinians arrested or imprisoned for comments on that medium since October 2015. After an international uproar, he was released after serving one month.

=== 2020 ===
On 16 July 2020, Barghouthi was detained at an Israeli checkpoint near 'Anata while driving home. No charge was laid against him at the time, but a court hearing was arranged for July 23. On 2 August he was arraigned before a court on a double charge of incitement and support of organizations hostile to Israel. One element in the indictment listed as evidence an allegation that he had praised a member of his family connected to the Sbarro restaurant suicide bombing two decades earlier.

On 10 August he made public a letter requesting either his release or conditions of detention that would enable him to teach online and continue to supervise his graduate students in the academic year beginning September. The presiding judge in his case ruled for his release on bail on 2 September. Some hours before his scheduled release the Israeli West Bank military commander placed him under the administrative detention regime for another four months. He is scheduled to appear before a military judge on 15 November, in a session closed to the public.

=== 2021 ===
In August 2021, Barghouthi was detained by the Palestinian Authority for 24 hours, and released after he went on a hunger strike.

=== 2023 ===
On 23 October 2023, as Israeli forces began a campaign of arresting thousands of Palestinians in the West Bank, Barghouthi was arrested by Israeli military forces who surrounded his family's home. He was sentenced by an Israeli court to six months of administrative detention. No formal charges have been laid against him. According to Scientists for Palestine, Barghouti's colleagues and family were gravely concerned about his health, citing widespread reports of increasingly brutal conditions for Palestinians in Israeli prisons. Barghouti's family estimates that he has lost 20-40 kilos under Israeli custody.

== Reactions ==
Barghouthi's arrest in late 2014 stirred protests as an infringement of such fundamental human rights such as freedom of speech and freedom of movement from the French Association of Academics for the Respect of International Law in Palestine, the British Committee for the Universities of Palestine, and the US-based Committee of Concerned Scientists.

Barghouthi's most recent arrest has been interpreted as part of a wider pattern, with the administrative detention of American Palestinian academic Ubai Aboudi, executive director of the Bisan Center for Research and Development in late 2019, and the arrest of Suhail Khoury and Rania Eliaa, a couple who direct classical music cultural associations in East Jerusalem and of writer Ahmad Qatamesh. Sahar Francis of Addameer ("Conscience"), a Palestinian Prisoner Support and Human Rights NGO, has claimed that the detention of major Palestinian cultural figures reflects an objective to repress civil society in Palestine, undermine the growth of its soft power by systematically erasing anything east of Jerusalem that expresses symbolically or otherwise a desire for self-determination.

Barghouthi's arrest in 2016 was the occasion for an international petition protesting his treatment and demanding his immediate release. Over 350 academic and professional colleagues signed the petition, among them Freeman Dyson, Professor Emeritus of Physics at the Institute for Advanced Study in Princeton; Fields Medal laureate David Mumford, Professor Emeritus of Mathematics at Brown University; Chandler Davis, Professor Emeritus of Mathematics at the University of Toronto and Noam Chomsky.

The 2018 Nobel laureate in Chemistry George P. Smith stated:

"The repeated arrest of one of Palestine's most active and prominent scientists is a direct attack to Palestinian's right to science protected under article 27 of the Universal Declaration of Human Rights, to which Israel is a signatory, as well as the article 15 of the International Covenant on Economic, Social and Cultural Rights. The violation of the right to science anywhere is an attack to scientists everywhere".

== Personal life ==
Barghouthi is the father of five children and has one grandchild.

== Sources ==
- Abbes, Ahmed (13 July 2016). "Israel must release Palestinian physicist". Nature. 535 (7611): 231. doi:10.1038/535231a. PMID 27411625.
- "Academics around the world sign petition to free Palestinian Astrophysicist Imad Barghouthi". Jewish Voice for Peace. 18 May 2016.
- Barghouthi, Imad Ahmad (10 August 2020). "'I ask you for your support and solidarity': Prof. Imad Barghouthi writes from Ofer prison". Mondoweiss.
- Barghouthi, Imad Ahmad (12 September 2020). "On my current administrative detention". Mondoweiss.
- "Freedom for Imad Barghouthi". Scientists for Palestine. 21 July 2020.
- Gilroy-Ware, Marcus (2017). Filling the Void: Emotion, Capitalism and Social Media. Duncan Baird Publishers. ISBN 978-1-910-92485-3.
- Giorgio, Michele (26 April 2016). "Israele arresta l'astrofisico palestinese Imad Barghouti". Il manifesto (in Italian).
- Holm-Nielsen, Lauritz; Tindemans, Peter (8 January 2015). "Euroscience concerned for pof. Imad al-Barghouthi". EuroScience.
- "Imad Barghouti Profile" – via ResearchGate.
- "Israel holds Palestinian professor despite successful appeal". Middle East Eye. 30 May 2016.
- "Israel reportedly jails Palestinian astrophysicist for incitement using Facebook 'likes' as evidence". The Independent. 14 October 2016.
- "Israel's use of administrative detention against Palestinians draws concern of UN rights office". United Nations. 10 April 2015.
- Kfoury, Assaf; Miller, Haynes; Rabbat, Nasser; Suleiman, Raid; Ulm, Franz-Josef (11 December 2019). "The administrative detention of Ubai Aboudi". Boston Globe.
- Khoury, Dina Rizk; Brand, Laurie (30 July 2020). "Recent arrest and detention of Imad Barghouti of Al-Quds University". MESA.
- Khoury, Jack (9 October 2016). "Israeli Military Court Sentences Palestinian Astrophysicist to 7 Months for Incitement". Haaretz.
- Lieber, Dov (26 April 2016). "Israel arrests pro-Hamas Palestinian astrophysics professor". The Times of Israel.
- Lieber, Dov (11 May 2016). "Israel renews detention of pro-Hamas Palestinian scientist". The Times of Israel.
- Muaddi, Qassam (22 January 2024). "Israeli policy unleashes disease among Palestinian prisoners". The New Arab.
- "Open Letter to PM Benjamin Netanyahu" (PDF). Association of Academics for the Respect of International Law in Palestine.
- "Renowned Palestinian Astrophysicist Imad Barghouthi Released from Israeli Prison". Palestine Chronicle. 1 June 2021.
- Scientists for Palestine (8 September 2020). "Prominent Palestinian astrophysicist Imad Barghouthi sentenced to administrative detention by Israel". Mondoweiss.
- Scientists for Palestine (27 August 2021). "Academic freedom in Palestine: a conversation with Imad Barghouthi". Mondoweiss.
- Swift, Robert (26 August 2020). "From science to classical music, Israel clamps down on Palestinian culture". +972 Magazine.
- Thompson, Barbara J.; Gopalswamy, Natchimuthuk; Davila, Joseph M.; Haubold, Hans J., eds. (2009). Putting the "I" in IHY: The United Nations Report for the International Heliophysical Year 2007. Springer Science & Business Media. ISBN 978-3-211-99180-0.
- "An update on the imprisonment of Prof. Barghouti". Scientists for Palestine. 20 January 2024.
