= Hassan Abdel Rahman Salameh =

- Born: August 9, 1971 (age 55); Khan Yunis camp, Gaza Strip, Palestine
- Military career
- Allegiance: Hamas
- Branch: Izz ad-Din al-Qassam Brigades
- Rank: Field commander
- Unit: Suicide bombers unit
- Conflicts: First Intifada

Hassan Abdel Rahman Hassan Salameh (born August 9, 1971) is a Palestinian member of Hamas serving a life sentence in Israeli prisons. A resident of Khan Yunis in the southern Gaza Strip, he was arrested in Hebron in 1996 and sentenced to 48 life terms plus an additional thirty years (totaling 1,175 years). He spent 13 of those years in solitary confinement. His arrest followed a pursuit by Israeli forces in Hebron in the southern West Bank, during which he was wounded before being captured. He was accused of membership in Hamas and its military wing, the Izz ad-Din al-Qassam Brigades, as well as directing the "Sacred Revenge" operations following the assassination of Qassam commander Yahya Ayyash, which resulted in the deaths of dozens of Israelis.

== Early life ==
Salameh was born on August 9, 1971, in the Khan Yunis refugee camp in the Gaza Strip. His family originates from the village of Al-Khaima in the Ramla district. He obtained his high school diploma and became a practicing Muslim through the Al-Imam Al-Shafi'i Mosque near his home.

From his youth, he formed a close bond with Yasser Al-Namrouti, despite their age difference. He was also closely associated with Yahya Sinwar. His upbringing involved participating in public seminars, festivals organized by Hamas and the Muslim Brotherhood, and supervising and participating in the Islamic Complex sports matches and student activities. He was heavily involved in dawah (missionary) activities from a young age.

== Operations and recruitment ==
With the outbreak of the First Intifada, Salameh was among the early participants in its activities, progressing through its operations and military apparatus.

=== Arrests and travel ===
He was arrested multiple times by Israeli forces before being released. In 1992, while being wanted by Israeli authorities, he left Palestine. He returned approximately two years later after spending time abroad.

=== Palestinian Authority detention and marriage ===
Salameh was detained by the Palestinian Authority security services for six months. Immediately upon his release, he got married. Following his subsequent arrest by Israeli forces and upon learning that his sentence exceeded the span of his life, he insisted on divorcing his wife to spare her the burden of his lifelong imprisonment.

== Imprisonment ==
Salameh was influenced by the Islamic scholar Abdullah Azzam, frequently quoting his words and reading his books. On one occasion, his mother visited him after he emerged from interrogation; he was brought out with his hands and feet shackled. Distressed by the sight, his mother began to cry. Salameh asked her not to weep, prompting her to utter ululations instead, which triggered chants of Takbir ("Allahu Akbar") among the other detainees.

== Egyptian court ruling ==
On May 16, 2015, an Egyptian court sentenced Salameh to death in absentia, despite the fact that he had already been held in an Israeli prison for nearly 20 years.

=== Reactions ===
- His Mother: His mother condemned the Egyptian ruling, stating: "The Egyptian judiciary passes judgments, but our Lord nullifies them because He knows the truth and always stands with the innocent. This is an injustice and a fabrication against my son. If Hassan is executed, he is a hero executed for honor, not treason. He avenged the martyr Yahya Ayyash, and that is an honor." She further noted that her son had faced injustice from the occupation, the Palestinian Authority—which she stated coordinated security-wise with Israeli authorities leading to his arrest—and was now facing injustice from Egypt.

== See also ==
- Abdullah Barghouti
