= 2002 Tel Aviv attack =

2002 terrorist attack in Tel Aviv, Israel

Seafood Market terrorist attack
- Part of the Second Intifada terrorist campaign
- The terrorist attack site
- Location: 32°03′53″N 34°46′56″E; Begin Road, Tel-Aviv, Israel
- Date: March 5, 2002; 24 years ago 2:10 am (UTC+2)
- Attack type: Mass shooting
- Weapons: M16 rifle, grenades, knife
- Deaths: 2 civilians, 1 police officer (+1 terrorist)
- Injuries: 35 civilians
- Perpetrator: Al-Aqsa Martyrs' Brigade claimed responsibility

The Seafood Market attack was a Palestinian terrorist attack on the Seafood Market restaurant in Tel Aviv, Israel, on 5 March 2002. Palestinian terrorist Ibrahim Hasouna murdered three Israeli civilians, including a Druze policeman and wounded 35.

The Al-Aqsa Martyrs' Brigade claimed responsibility for the attack.

An Israeli court found Marwan Barghouti, head of Tanzim, guilty of directing this and other shootings, including the Murder of Georgios Tsibouktzakis.

== Background ==
The attack was carried out by Tanzim, and involved three operatives: Drivers Mazen Mahmoud Omar Khadi and Marad Nazmi Agloni, and shooter Ibrahim Hasouna. Under police interrogation, the drivers confessed that they had initially infiltrated Jerusalem, planning to carry out an attack in Pisgat Ze'ev, but were deterred by a heavy police presence. They then drove to Tel Aviv. Hasouna asked to be dropped off in a densely populated area, and the drivers decided to drop him off on a pedestrian bridge overlooking a number of restaurants in central Tel Aviv.

The attack occurred in the early morning, at which time the Seafood market restaurant was crowded with people gathered for an Oriental music evening and a bachelorette party.

== The attack ==
At 2:10 AM, Hasouna opened fire. Shooting at diners sitting near the windows with an M16 rifle, he emptied two magazines. According to eyewitness Gilli Cohen, "people started to push their way to the bathrooms, and there was mass hysteria". He also threw two fragmentation grenades at people escaping the restaurant, though they did not detonate. Hasouna then headed for the "Mifgash Hasteakim" restaurant next door, pulling out a knife and stabbing at police officers and civilians attempting to restrain him, killing a police officer, but was eventually shot dead.

=== Victims ===
- Salim Barakat, 33, of Yarka
- Yosef Haybi, 52, of Herzliya
- Eli Dahan, 53, of Lod

== Aftermath ==
In the immediate aftermath of the attack, police set up roadblocks, at one of which Khadi and Agloni were caught while attempting to flee to Ramallah via Jerusalem.

In response to this attack, as well as to a shooting in Jerusalem that killed an Israeli woman and terrorism over the previous weekend which killed 22 Israelis, the Israel Defense Forces (IDF) immediately launched a series of raids in the West Bank and Gaza Strip in which at least 17 Palestinians were killed. According to Israeli media, the attacks were set to continue for several days, focusing on the Tanzim militia.

When Tanzim head Marwan Barghouti was arrested and brought to trial in Israel, the attack was among the offenses listed in the indictment. Barghouti is currently serving five life sentences in an Israeli prison.
