= Barghouti family =

Palestinian family

Barghouti البرغوثي Barghouthi, Barghuthi, Al-Barghouti, Barghouty
- Family
- Parent family: Bani Zeid clan (traditional)
- Country: Palestine
- Current region: Ramallah and al-Bireh Governorate, Palestine
- Etymology: Named after Barghout (traditional)
- Origin: Arabian Peninsula (traditional)
- Historic seat: Deir Ghassaneh, Ramallah and al-Bireh Governorate
- Members: Marwan Barghouti; Mustafa Barghouti; Mourid Barghouti; Tamim al-Barghouti; Omar Barghouti; Hussein Barghouthi; Fadwa Barghouti; Abdullah Barghouti; Imad Barghouthi; Mohammad Barghouti; Bashir Barghouti; Arab Barghouti; Musa Barghouti; Abdul Latif Barghouti
- Connected families: Bani Zeid
- Distinctions: Active in Palestinian Politics, Literature, and Academia
- Traditions: Palestinian Nationalism; Arab Nationalism; Islamic Heritage

Barghouti (other spellings Barghuthi, Barghouthi, or Al-Barghuthi, classical Arabic: البرغوثي al-Barghūthī) is the surname of a prominent Palestinian family. Many of its members are notable figures in Palestinian political and cultural life, and mainly come from Ramallah and al-Bireh Governorate's most prominent villages of Deir Ghassanah, Aboud, Kobar and Bani Zeid.

== Origin traditions ==
There are various traditions regarding the origins of the Barghouti family. According to Palestinian researcher Mustafa al-Dabbagh, the family is named after a person called Barghout and traces its roots back to the Bani Zeid clan which originated in the Arabian Peninsula, before eventually settling in Deir Ghassaneh, Palestine.

Omar al-Saleh al-Barghouti, born in 1894, recounts a tradition that the clan traces its lineage to second caliph Omar ibn al-Khattab. Following the events involving Abd Allah ibn al-Zubayr during the Umayyad period, they traveled from the Hejaz to Egypt, then moved to Tunisia, and later to Palestine to support Saladin in his conquest of the region.

== List of notable members ==
- Abd al-Jabir al-Barghouthi, Palestinian commander of the Bani Zeid during the Peasants' revolt in Palestine
- Abdul Latif Barghouti (1928–2002), Palestinian writer and poet
- Abdullah Barghouti (born 1979), Palestinian leading commander in Hamas' armed wing Izz ad-Din al-Qassam Brigades
- Bashir Barghouti (1931–2000), Palestinian communist and journalist
- Fadwa Barghouti (born 1963), Palestinian lawyer and member of the Fatah Council
- Hussein Barghouthi (1954–2002), Palestinian poet and playwright
- Imad Barghouthi (born 1962), Palestinian astrophysicist and public figure, subject to several administrative detentions in Israeli prisons for his political statements, as well as one arrest by the Palestinian Authority.
- Marwan Barghouthi (born 1959), Palestinian leader of Fatah, jailed by Israel during the Second Intifada
- Arab Barghouti (born 1990), son of Marwan and Fadwa, and campaigner for his father's freedom.
- Mohammad Barghouti, Palestinian former labor minister of the Palestinian Authority
- Mourid Barghouti (born 1944–2021), Palestinian poet and writer
- Mustafa Barghouti (born 1954), Palestinian politician, physician, and one state solution activist who founded the Palestinian National Initiative alongside Haidar Abdel-Shafi and Edward Said, among others
- Nai Barghouti, Palestinian composer and singer
- Omar Barghouti (born 1964), activist and co-founder of the anti Israel BDS movement
- Tamim al-Barghouti (born 1977), Palestinian poet and political scientist, son of Mourid Barghouti

== Family tree ==
Marwan Barghouti	Fadwa Ibrahim	Mourid Barghouti	Radwa Ashour
			Tamim Barghouti
