= Bahrain–Palestine relations =

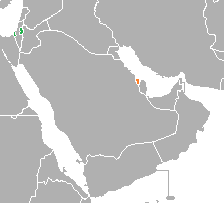

- Palestine: Bahrain

Diplomatic mission
- Embassy of the State of Palestine in Bahrain: N/A

Political and economic relations exist between the State of Palestine and the Kingdom of Bahrain. Palestine has an embassy in Manama, but Bahrain does not have a representative office or embassy in Palestine. As two primarily Muslim Arab countries in the Middle East region, they share many cultural similarities, and a small percentage of the Palestinian diaspora reside in Bahrain.

== Relapse in relationships ==
The holding of the Bahrain Economic Peace Conference or also called Peace to Prosperity workshop on June 25 and 26, 2019, sparked controversy. Palestinian leaders rejected the plan and boycotted the conference. Palestinian Prime Minister Muhammad Shtayyeh said: “The content of the American workshop in the Bahraini capital, Manama, is poor, and its representation is weak and its outputs will be sterile.”

On September 11, 2020, relations between the two countries deteriorated due to the Bahrain–Israel normalization agreement and the subsequent recall by Palestine of its ambassador Khaled Aref. The Palestinian leadership also announced its strong rejection and denunciation of the US-Bahraini-Israeli tripartite declaration.

After the start of the Gaza war in 2023, pro-Palestine protests broke out across the country, many of them taking place outside of the Israeli embassy in Bahrain. Human Rights Watch reported that the Bahraini authorities had arrested 57 protestors, 23 of whom were under the age of 18, and at least one person had been jailed for posts made on social media. Bahrain recalled their ambassador to Israel in November 2023, around the same time the Israeli ambassador left Manama. Flights between Israel and Bahrain were suspended, but there were no mention of any economic ties being cut. The vast majority of Bahraini civilians are staunchly pro-Palestinian, and the ties between Bahrain and Israel continuing widens the rift between the government and the population's interests, with domestic pressure and civil unrest set to potentially increase as the war persists.

== See also ==
- Foreign relations of Palestine
- Embassy of Palestine, Manama
