= Operation Shavim Legvulam =

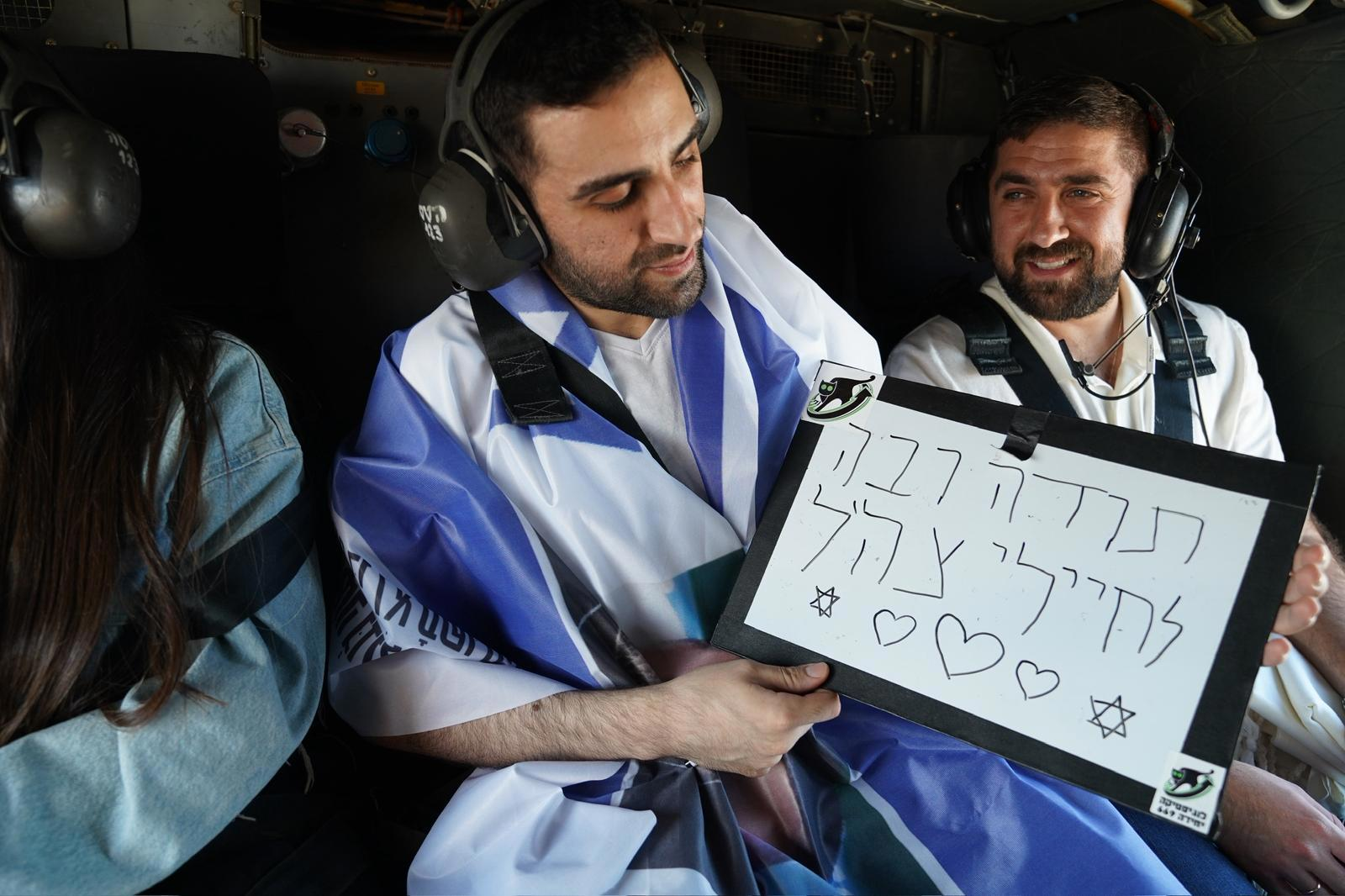
- Operation Shavim Legvulam. 2025 Israeli military and humanitarian operation aimed at securing the return of Israeli hostages, both living and deceased, held in the Gaza Strip following the Hamas-led attacks of October 7, 2023.
- Native name: מבצע שבים לגבולם
- Date: October 2025
- Location: Gaza Strip
- Type: Hostage repatriation and humanitarian operation
- Participants: Israel, Hamas, United States, Egypt, Qatar
- Outcome: Ongoing; partial release of hostages and bodies

Operation Shavim Legvulam (Hebrew: מבצע שבים לגבולם, romanized: Mivtza Shavim Legvulam, lit. 'Returning to Their Border') is a 2025 Israeli military and humanitarian operation aimed at securing the return of Israeli hostages, both living and deceased, held in the Gaza Strip following the Hamas-led attacks of October 7, 2023.

The operation is conducted under a mediated agreement involving the United States, Egypt, Turkey and Qatar.

== Background ==
The operation was initiated amid ongoing negotiations between Israel and Hamas regarding the release of hostages taken during the October 7 attacks. Over 240 Israelis and foreign nationals were abducted during the assault and transferred to Gaza. Despite several previous exchange deals, dozens of hostages remained in captivity by mid-2025.

== Objectives ==
The primary goals of the operation are:

- The safe repatriation of surviving hostages.
- The recovery of the bodies of deceased hostages.
- Implementation of partial withdrawal measures of the IDF from Gaza as part of a broader ceasefire framework.
- Coordination with international mediators under the U.S. "21-Point Plan."

== Terms of the Agreement ==
Under the terms reported by Israeli and international media, Israel agreed to release a number of Palestinian prisoners, primarily minors and women, in exchange for the repatriation of Israeli hostages. As part of the deal, IDF units would withdraw from designated areas within the Gaza Strip to allow the implementation of the ceasefire and humanitarian arrangements. Humanitarian corridors were also established to enable medical evacuation, the transfer of aid, and the safe passage of international personnel. high-profile prisoners such as Marwan Barghouti and senior Hamas commanders were explicitly excluded from the exchange framework.

== Name and Symbolism ==
The name Shavim Legvulam originates from the biblical verse "V'shavu banim legvulam" ("And the children shall return to their border"; Jeremiah 31:16). The phrase conveys a message of hope and spiritual restoration, reflecting Israel's aspiration to bring the hostages, referred to as "sons and daughters", safely back to their homeland. The name also carries a symbolic link to previous Israeli operations focused on recovering captives and missing persons.
