= Mohammed Mutaleb =

Sheikh Mohammed Salah Abdul Mutaleb (محمد صالح عبدالمطلب) was an Imam, and suspected leader of al-Jihad, murdered in July 1998 while leaving Al-Husseini mosque in Sana'a, Yemen.

His death was believed to be an assassination by the State Security Intelligence-sponsored Fatah Revolutionary Council.
