= Assouline (surname) =

Assouline is a surname. Notable people with the surname include:

- David Assouline (born 1959), French politician
- Lior Asulin (1980–2023), Israeli footballer
- Pierre Assouline (born 1953), French writer and journalist
- Ron Assouline (born 1957), Israeli film director
