= Arab Barghouti =

Palestinian activist

- عرب البرغوثي
- Born: 1990 (age 35–36); Jerusalem
- Parents: Marwan Barghouti (father); Fadwa Barghouti (mother)

Arab Barghouti (Arabic: عرب البرغوثي, romanized: ʿArab al-Bargūṯiyy; born 1990) is a Palestinian campaigner for the freedom of his father, Marwan Barghouti, and all Palestinian prisoners of Israel.

== Early life and education ==
Arab was born in 1990 in Jerusalem to Marwan and Fadwa Barghouti. He is the couple's fourth and youngest child. Marwan has written that Arab was so-named because he was "proud to be an Arab, despite all the bitterness of the Arab situation."

When Arab was 11 years old, his father was captured by the Israeli army, tortured, and put on trial. Marwan was accused of charges relating to terrorism; he both denied the charges and contested the legitimacy of the court. At a session of Marwan's trial, when Arab was 12 years old, Arab tried to go to his father who was in the dock, but was attacked by an Israeli man, who slapped him in the face. In the documentary Tomorrow's Freedom, Arab relates that he was rescued from the attack by an Al Jazeera journalist. Marwan was ultimately convicted of several charges in a verdict that has been criticised both for lack of both evidence and legal propriety.

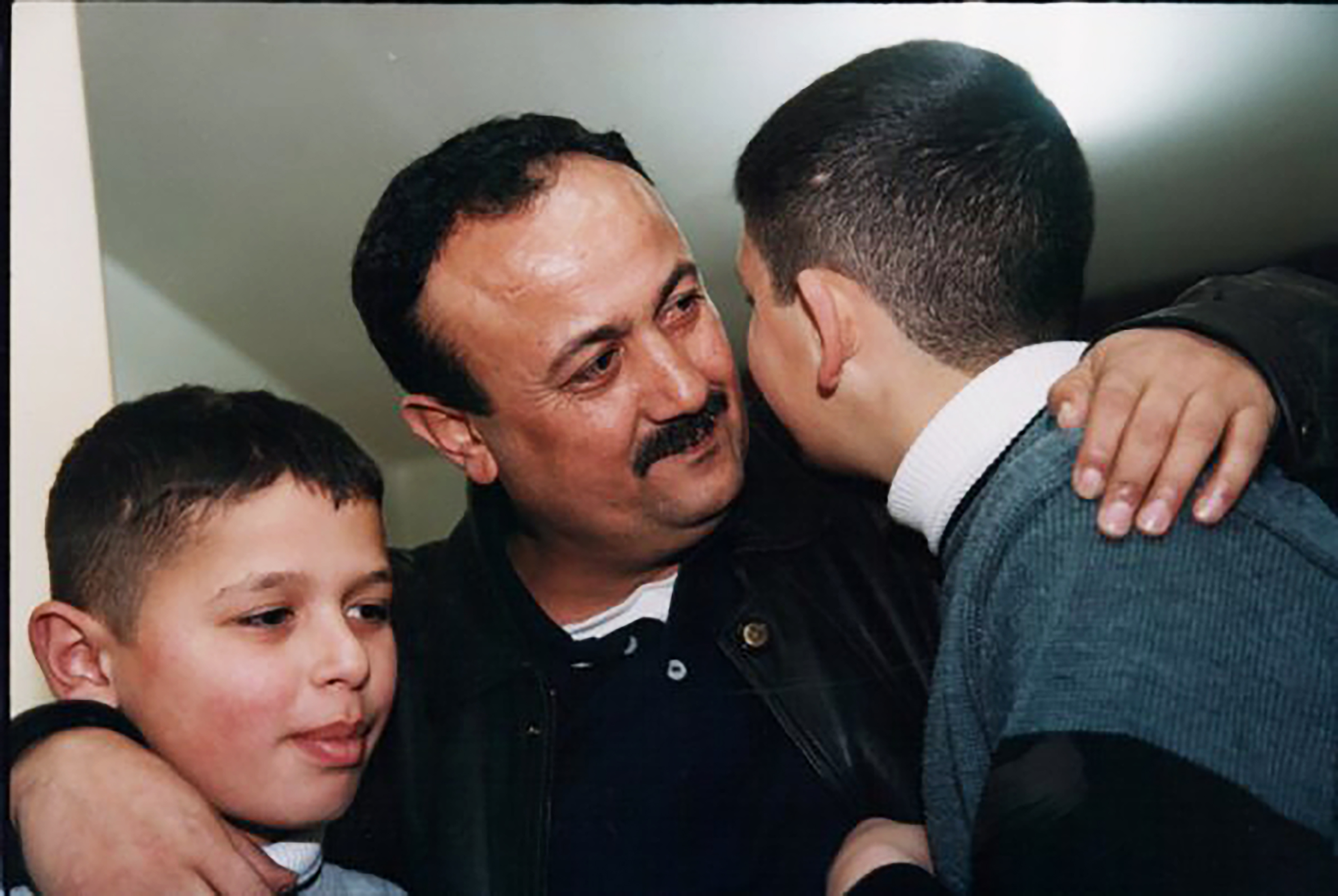
A photograph showing Arab Barghouti (left) with his father and a brother.

Arab later obtained a B.A. in economics from Bir Zeit University and a master's degree in financial analysis and investment management at Saint Mary’s College of California in the San Francisco Bay Area. He is also a qualified life coach.

Arab managed a coding academy in Ramallah, Palestine. He has spoken publicly about his passion for technology, and his ambition to make Palestine a destination for the tech industry in the Middle East.

== As a campaigner ==
In 2017 Arab launched the Saltwater Challenge, an international online campaign in support of his father and other Palestinian prisoners who were on hunger strike over cuts to visitation rights, medical neglect, and other poor prison conditions. The prisoners drunk salt water to stave off organ damage while on hunger strike, so the campaign challenged people around the world to film themselves drinking a glass of salt water in solidarity. Arab initiated the campaign with a viral video doing just that, and challenging Mohammed Assaf, a Palestinian winner of Arab Idol, and a number of other Arab celebrities to do likewise. Assaf and others took up the challenge, and it quickly spread worldwide. The prisoners called-off their hunger strike after 40 days following limited concessions from Israel.

In recent years, Arab has taken a more prominent role in the campaign to free Marwan. Since 2024, he has made many broadcast media appearances to advocate for his father, including on CNN (interviewed by both Christiane Amanpour and Isa Soares), PBS Newshour, Channel 4, France24, Al Jazeera English, NPR, and Zeteo. He has also appeared on podcasts including The Rest is Politics: Leading, The Beinart Notebook, and The Tea with Myriam François.

Arab has appeared onstage with bands such as Massive Attack and Gorillaz, who are supporters of the campaign to free his father. After one such appearance, he met and was thanked by the Spanish Prime Minister Pedro Sánchez. He has also met the President of Ireland and spoken via video link at a meeting held in the UK parliament.

Arab's advocacy situates Marwan's case within the context of Palestinians imprisoned by Israel and the escalation of violence toward Palestinians by Israel since 2023. He has called on rights groups to do more to halt abuses against Palestinian prisoners, including his father.

== Personal life ==
Arab lives in Ramallah. Like his father, he is a fan of the Real Madrid football club.

== See also ==
- Barghouti family
