= Ron Assouline =

Israeli screenwriter

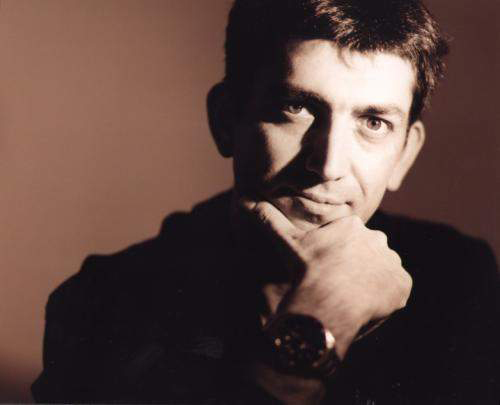
Ron Assouline

Ron Assouline (Hebrew: רון אסולין) is a film director, screenwriter, creative director, producer, and a lecturer at the Sammy Ofer School of Communications at the Interdisciplinary Center Herzliya (IDC). Assouline is also the founder and owner of Filmind, a film and advertising firm. He has directed many films for museums around the world, but mainly in Israel, including Journey to Jerusalem, a 100 episode series, shown regularly at the Western Wall in Jerusalem and A Human Sanctuary, a historic drama film presented at the Shrine of the Book at the Israel Museum. Assouline has also produced and directed many television commercials, including those for Benjamin Netanyahu's 1996 election campaign and Ehud Barak's 1999 campaign.

== Biography ==
Ron Assouline was born in Israel, in the city of Ness Tziona in 1957. After his military service as a combat tank commander, he studied in the Department of Film and Television at the Faculty of Arts of Tel Aviv University (TAU). His graduation dramatic film, A Different Shadow, won the director's prize as well as the first prize in the category of photography at the Israeli Short Film Competition hosted by the Israeli Film Institute. The film was displayed at the Tel Aviv Museum. Soon after, Assouline began his professional career in the media industry as a director and producer, and in 1988 he founded Filmind.

== Advertising ==
Assouline has planned or directed many popular commercials for companies and public-sector organizations, including the glass boy in Life Depends On Your Speed, the disappearing driver in Words Can Kill – No Texting While Driving the glass walls in Feel the Road When Crossing, Don't Let Alcohol Drive, for the Israeli Road Safety Authority. His campaign for the National Lottery campaign the Loto-Gutzim Let the Numbers Improve Your Life was called a breakthrough by advertising strategist Atara Biller.

Assouline has managed several branding campaigns including Drive Wise for the Israeli Road Safety Authority, which won two Webi Awards in 2013.

== Political Campaigns ==
Since 1984, Ron Assouline has served as lead film director and media campaign manager in national elections in Israel and abroad. Among his campaigns: the elections of Israeli Prime Minister Benjamin Netanyahu in 1996, Israeli Prime Minister Ehud Barak in 1999, and Austrian Chancellor Alfred Gusenbauer in 2006. In the 1996 Israeli elections Assouline implemented a change of language in propaganda broadcasts under Arthur Finkelstein's strategy "Making A Secure Peace". The campaign ended with the surprising election of Benjamin Netanyahu together with the Likud party, over incumbent Prime Minister Shimon Peres of the Labor Party. In the 1999 Israeli elections, he was recruited by James Carville, Robert Shrum, and Stanley Greenberg - the American political consultants who contributed to the election of President Bill Clinton in 1992. Ron directed and managed the TV and radio campaign of "One Israel" under the headline "Israel Wants Change", which resulted in Ehud Barak's landslide victory. In 2010, he created "The Partners Campaign" for the Geneva Initiative, in which he directed the leaders of the Palestinian Authority, Saeb Erekat, Riyad al-Maliki, Yasser Abed Rabbo, Jibril Rajoub, and Sufian Abu Zaida in a direct appeal to the Israeli public.

== Museums ==
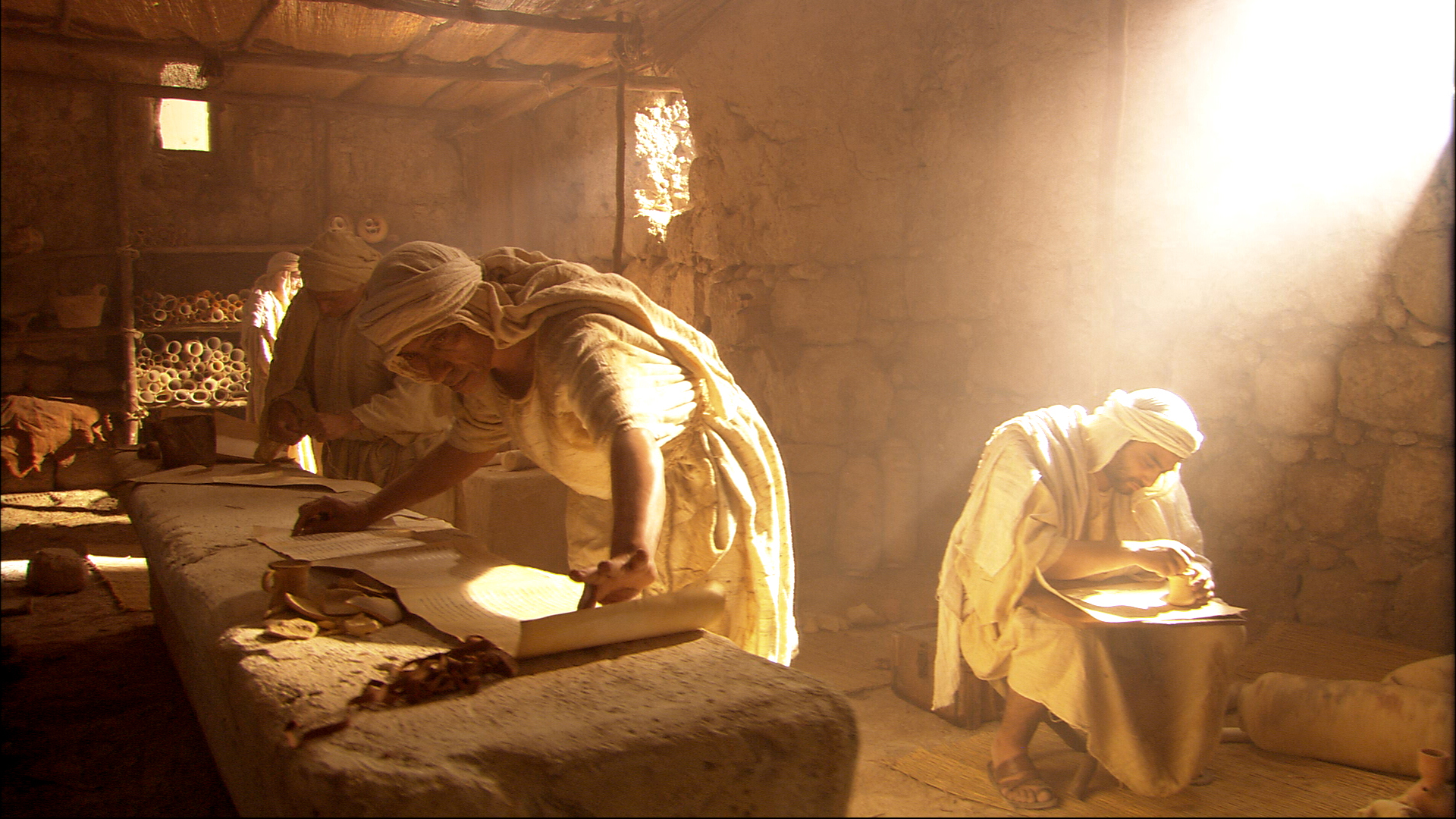
A Human Sanctuary

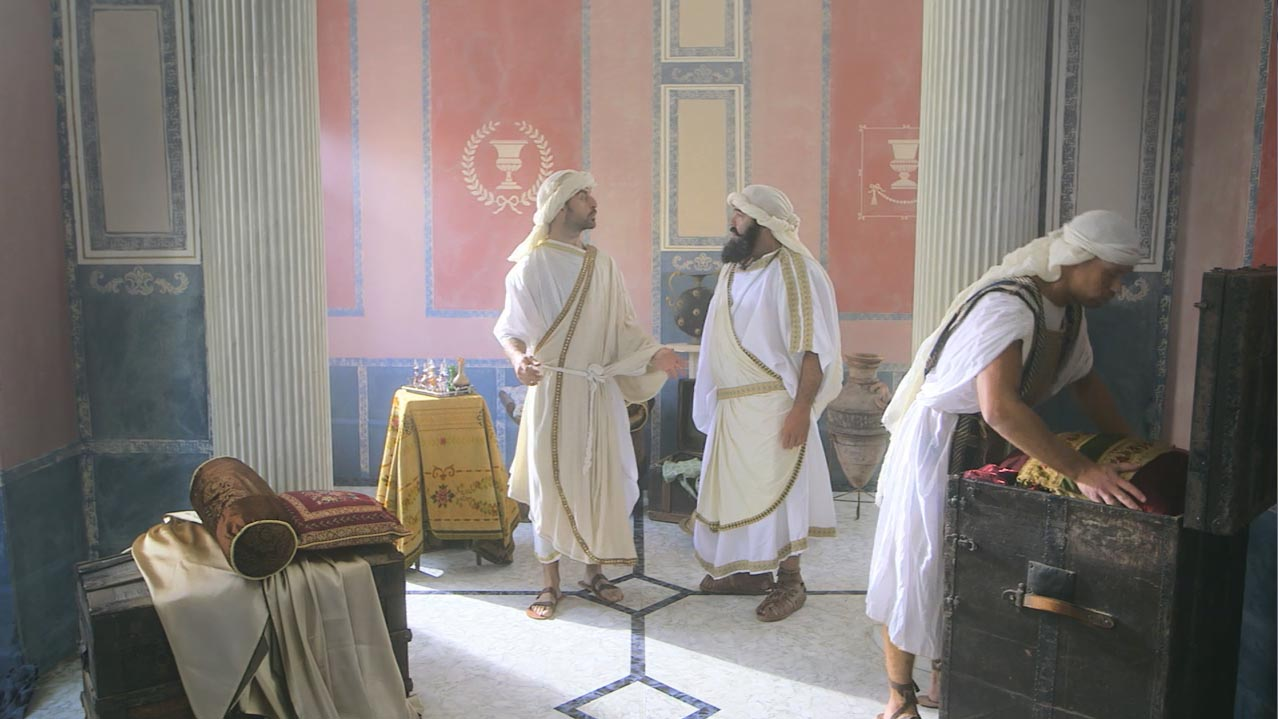
The Journey to Jerusalem

Since 1988, Assouline has developed and directed content for many museums and experience centers. Among the most prominent are the Herzl Museum in Jerusalem, the visitors center of the Shrine of the Book at the Israel Museum with its center piece A Human Sanctuary, the Chain of Generations at the Western Wall, which won the Themed Entertainment Association (TEA) award in 2008 for outstanding achievement in the field of media, and the Golan Magic at Katzrin, which won the gold medal at the NYF Festival in New York.

He also directed Journey to Jerusalem, a cinematic work of 100 episodes, shown regularly at the Western Wall in Jerusalem. The film portrays the life and wanderings of the Jewish communities around the world, from the destruction of the Second Temple until today.

In 2012 Assouline and Filmind created the Israeli pavilion at Floriade - the world's horticulture exposition in the Netherlands.

== Television ==
Starting with the airing of the Israeli Channel 2 pilot in 1987, Assouline directed television programs for the new channel, including: Seven Thirty Around the World with Orly Yaniv, and the fashion program Pose hosted by model Anat Biran. He also directed and produced the Movie Magazine with Anat Atzmon and Dan Turjeman for the Film Channel on cable television.

In 1994, with the launching of commercial television broadcasting in Israel and the establishment of Channel 2, he managed the screen design of Channel 2 and News2, directed the prime time travel program Passport hosted by Nir Hachlili, was involved in the graphic design of Wheel of Fortune with Erez Tal, and other programs of the three franchisees of Channel 2 (Keshet, Reshet and Tel'ad). In addition, he developed the graphics package for the program Tonight with Gabi Gazit for Channel 1.

== Awards ==
- US International Film & Video Festival, 1994 - Gold award for FEPZ
- TEA Award for Outstanding Achievements for The Chain of Generations
- Israeli Film Institute 1984 – Best Film and Best Photography for A Different Shadow
- Golden Lens 1994 - First Prize for MUL_T_LOCK. The Art of Locking
- Israel Festival of Visual Communications, 1995 - First Prize for MUL_T_LOCK. The Art of Locking
- Israel Festival of Visual Communications, 1996 - Major Award for KOOR. Going Global
- Israel Festival of Visual Communications, 1997 - Second Prize for Tadiran Communications. The Answer is Yes
- Golden Cactus 2011 – for HishGad (lottery) Chefs Advertisement
- Golden Cactus 2011 - for LOTTO Landlord Advertisement
- Golden Cactus 2011 – for LOTTO Boss Advertisement
- Golden Cactus 2011 – for LOTTO Bank Advertisement
- WEBI Awards 2013 - Two awards for the Road Safety Authority website and digital activity
- NYF New York Festival - Gold award for Golan Magic
