= Nadeen Ayoub =

Palestinian-American model (born 1998)

- نادين أيوب
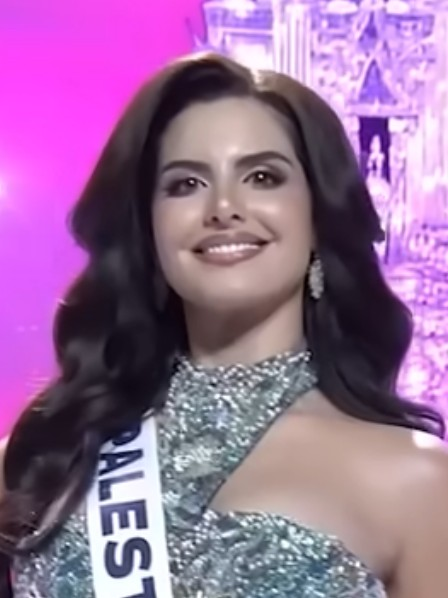
- Ayoub in 2025
- Born: August 23, 1998 (age 28); Michigan, U.S.
- Education: University of Western Ontario (BA; BS)
- Occupation: Model
- Spouse: Sharaf Barghouti (m. 2016, divorced)
- Relatives: Marwan Barghouti (ex–father-in-law); Fadwa Barghouti (ex–mother-in-law)
- Beauty pageant titleholder
- Title: Miss Palestine 2022; Miss Earth Palestine 2022; Miss Earth – Water 2022; Miss Universe Palestine 2025
- Major competitions: Miss Earth 2022; (Top 4 – Miss Earth Water); Miss Universe 2025; (Top 30)

Nadeen Ayoub (Arabic: نادين أيوب, romanized: Nādīn Ayyūb; born August 23, 1998) is a Palestinian model and beauty pageant titleholder who won Miss Palestine 2022. She represented her country at Miss Universe 2025 and Miss Earth 2022, becoming the first Palestinian to take part in the former competition and to place in both, winning the title Miss Earth – Water in the latter contest.

== Early life and education ==
Ayoub was born on August 23, 1998, in Michigan, United States, to Palestinian parents. Her family moved there to treat her epileptic brother. Her mother was born in Hebron, while her father was born in Nablus to parents who were forced to flee from Jaffa and Ramle in 1948; they met during their studies at An-Najah University and later settled in Ramallah.

Shortly after Ayoub's birth, the family moved back to Ramallah, where she was raised until the age of six, and then returned to the US, living between Michigan, Illinois, and Minnesota for three years. During her teenage years, her family moved to Canada, where she completed her secondary education. Media outlets have stated that, throughout her childhood, she lived in Detroit, Michigan; Illinois; Minnesota; Ontario, Canada; Dubai, United Arab Emirates; and Ramallah, Palestine.

Ayoub studied English literature and psychology at the University of Western Ontario, during which years she was also part of an exchange program with Birzeit University in Palestine. After graduating, she moved back to Ramallah, teaching at the local Friends School as well as volunteering with United for Humanity and the Palestine Children's Relief Fund.

== Pageantry ==
In June 2022, Ayoub won Miss Palestine, a title she would hold for the next four years.

=== Miss Earth 2022 ===
As Miss Palestine, Ayoub competed at Miss Earth 2022. At the contest, she became a finalist, progressing to the top four question-and-answer round where she was asked about a particular issue she sought to correct and its corresponding solution. In her answer, she highlighted the "ignorance and selfishness of people", which she cited as the cause of environmental catastrophes and sought to correct through an "educational campaign with governmental and non-governmental organizations in Palestine". At the end of the competition, she was named Miss Earth – Water in top five, becoming the first Palestinian to obtain the title.

=== Miss Universe 2025 ===
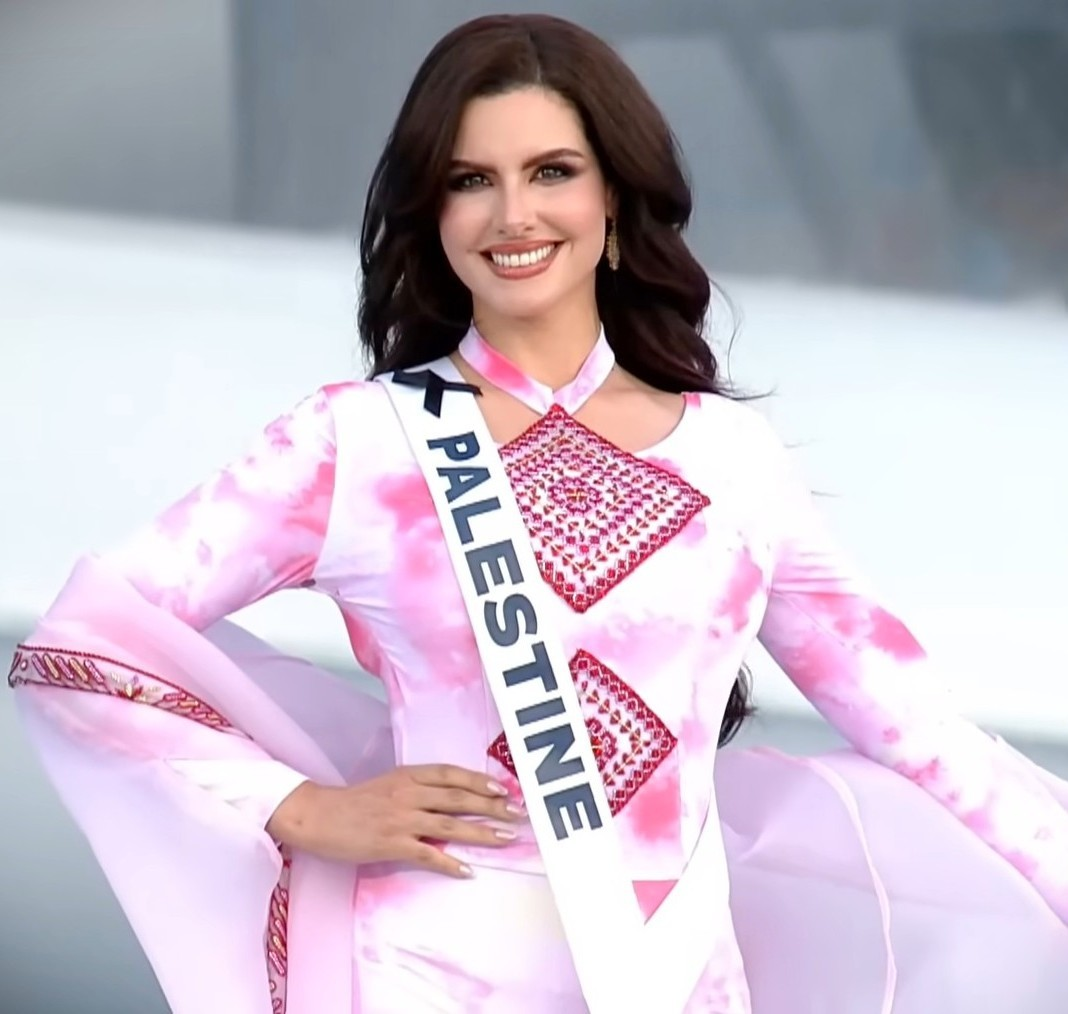
Ayoub at Miss Universe 2025

Following Miss Earth, Ayoub was called for a modeling session at a fashion show in Italy; there, representatives from the Miss Sweden organization noticed her and helped her establish the Miss Universe Palestine organization. In August 2025, the newly formed organization announced her as its entrant to Miss Universe 2025, marking Palestine's debut in the annual contest. With the announcement, Ayoub stated that she was to compete in Miss Universe after Miss Earth, having won in 2022, but her participation was delayed after the outbreak of the Gaza war. The Miss Universe Organization welcomed her participation as part of its efforts in "celebrating diversity, cultural exchange, and the empowerment of women".

The announcement received significant international attention in the press due to its timing amid the Gaza war. Marni Rose McFall of Newsweek deemed her participation significant because of her stated mission to "challenge perceptions of Palestinians and empower women and children" amid heavy casualties in the Israeli bombing and invasion of the Gaza Strip. Meanwhile, Ritu Singh of NDTV questioned Ayoub's appointment and expressed skepticism over the dearth of biographical information about her online.

Ayoub competed in the contest with a team based in Palestine and the Philippines, training with the Kagandahang Flores pageant camp. For the contest, Ayoub planned to wear designs from Palestinian and International designers to express her Palestinian identity. Her participation was supported by American makeup artist Huda Kattan, whose cosmetic brand Huda Beauty sponsored her at the competition.

During the opening ceremony, media outlets noted the perceived animosity of Melanie Shiraz of Israel toward Ayoub, an observation Shiraz denied but was criticized for online. According to Ayoub, Shiraz had repeatedly tried to take a picture besides her with an Israeli flag. Both contestants claimed to have received death threats – Shiraz following the ceremony, and Ayoub after Shiraz posted a video critical of her participation.

== Other ventures ==
In 2024, Ayoub was offered a position at the SEE Institute in Dubai, an educational institution dealing with sustainability; as of November 2025, she trains content creators with an interest in the topic. In Dubai, Ayoub founded the Olive Green Academy, which administers courses related to artificial intelligence and sustainability to women.

== Personal life ==
Ayoub describes herself as a "Palestinian international citizen", splitting her time between Ramallah, Amman, and Dubai. Her parents live in Canada and she has family across the West Bank and Jordan.

According to Middle East Eye (MEE), Ayoub was subjected to online harassment and personal attacks from pro-Israel groups following her interview with the outlet in December 2025. Betar USA and StopAntisemitism had focused on her previous marriage to Sharaf Barghouti – the son of Palestinian political leader Marwan Barghouti, who has been imprisoned in an Israeli jail since 2002, and whom Ayoub had described as someone that Palestinians are proud of and "a peace symbol". MEE compared the personal remarks against Ayoub with those StopAntisemitism had made about children's content creator Ms. Rachel.

Awards and achievements
New title	Miss Universe Palestine; 2025	Incumbent
Preceded by Romina Denecken (Chile)	Miss Earth Water; 2022	Succeeded by Đỗ Thị Lan Anh (Vietnam)
New title	Miss Earth Palestine; 2025	Succeeded by Yara Bishi
New title	Miss Palestine; 2022–2025	Incumbent
