= Khaled Aref =

Palestine's ambassador to Bahrain

Khaled Aref خالد عارف
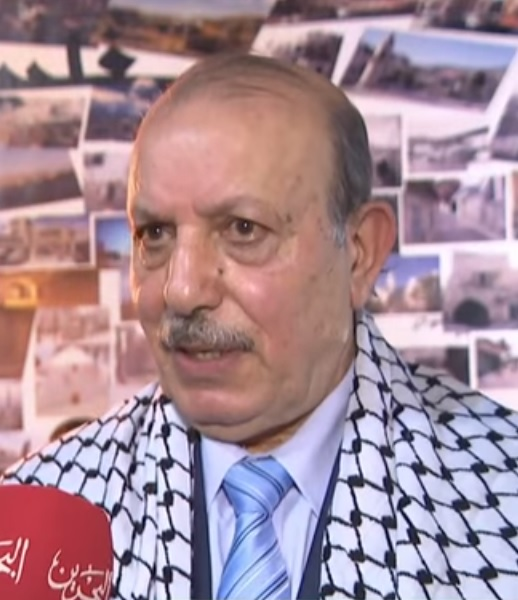

Palestinian Ambassador to Bahrain
- In office 12 April 2011 – 21 July 2025

Personal details
- Born: Taha Mohammad Mahmoud Abdul Kader; 25 April 1946 (age 80) Kaukab Abu al-Hija, Mandatory Palestine
- Citizenship: State of Palestine

Taha Mohammad Mahmoud Abdul Kader, alternatively known as Khaled Aref, and by his kunya Abu Adham(Arabic: طه محمد محمود عبد القادر, born on April 25 1946) is a Palestinian diplomat and member of Fatah who served as the ambassador of the State of Palestine to Bahrain from April 12 2011 until July 21 2025.

== Ambassadorship ==
On 6 October 2010, president of Palestine Mahmoud Abbas appointed Abu Adham as ambassador to Bahrain. On 12 April 2011, Abu Adham presented his credentials to King Hamad bin Isa Al Khalifa, officially starting his duty as the representative of the Palestinian government and the president in Bahrain.

On 11 September 2020, the Palestinian Foreign Affairs Ministry withdrew Abu Adham from Bahrain on the wake of the Bahrain–Israel normalization agreement. However, he returned to his post on 18 November 2020.

== Early life ==
Abu Adham was born on 25 April 1946 in Kaukab Abu al-Hija, Mandatory Palestine. He spent time in the Ain al-Hilweh refugee camp where he was involved with Fatah. He was known to be an authoritative figure within Fatah, in the camp, and around Sidon, Lebanon.

== Personal life ==
Abu Adham is married to Rihab Al Afifi. They have 4 children and 9 grandchildren.

== See also ==
- Palestine-Bahrain relations
- Embassy of the State of Palestine in Bahrain
