= Fadwa Barghouti =

Palestinian lawyer (born 1963)

- فدوى البرغوثي
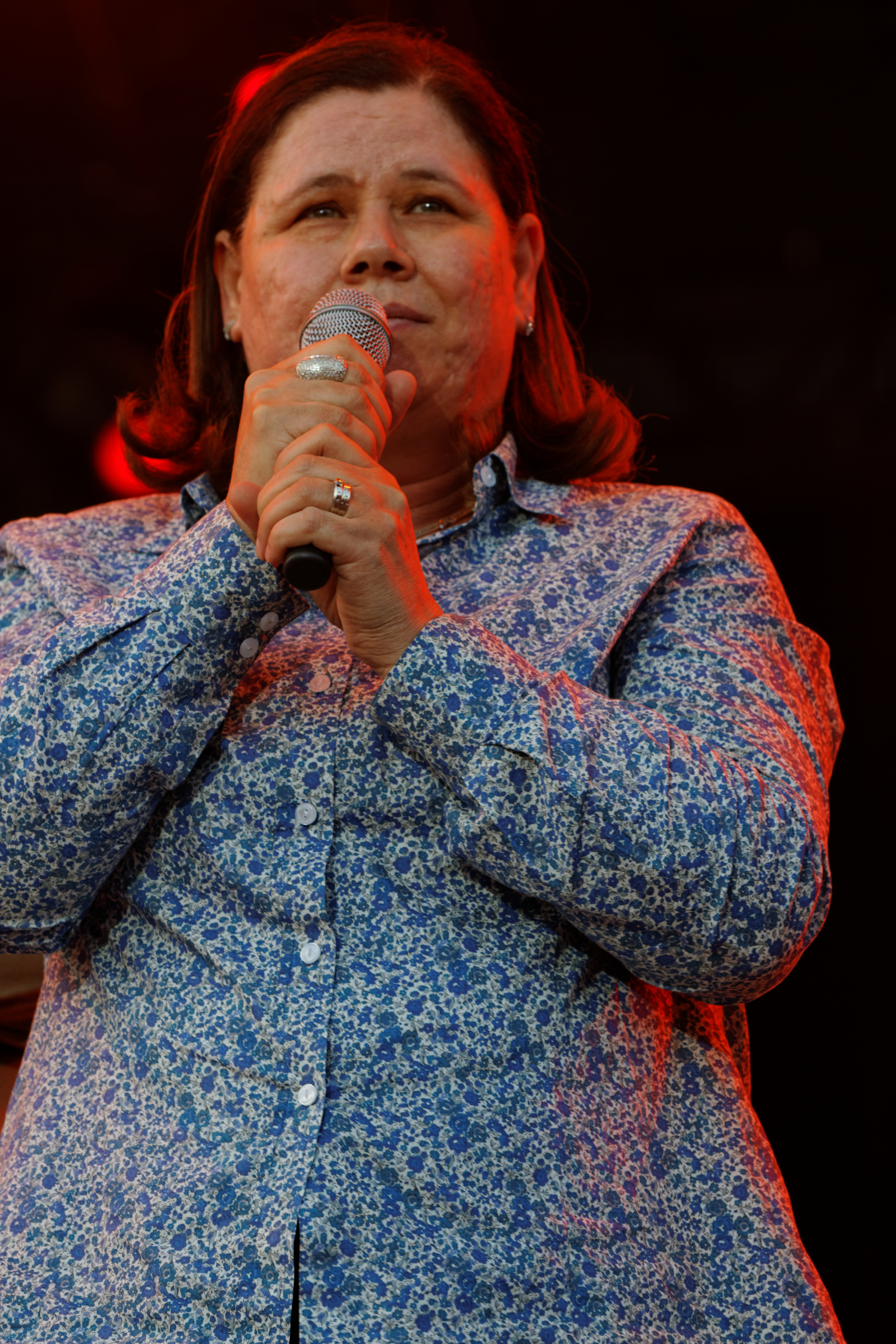
- Fadwa Barghouti at Fête de l'Humanité 2014
- Born: 15 May 1963 (age 63); Kobar, Ramallah, Jordanian-annexed West Bank
- Education: Al-Quds University; Beirut Arab University
- Spouse: Marwan Barghouti (m. 1984)
- Children: 4, including Arab Barghouti
- Relatives: Nadeen Ayoub (ex–daughter-in-law)

Fadwa Al-Barghouti (Arabic: فدوى البرغوثي; born 15 May 1963), also known by the kunya Umm Al-Qassam (أم القسام), is a Palestinian lawyer and member of the Fatah council. The wife of politician Marwan Barghouti, who is currently held in Israeli prison for murder, she holds a master's degree in law in 2003 from Al-Quds University, and holds a bachelor's degree in law from Beirut University in 1997.

In 2009, she won and became a member of the Fatah Revolutionary Council after elections held during the Sixth Congress of Fatah in Bethlehem. On 4 December 2016, she won again as a member of the council.

Fadwa Al-Barghouti will run in the upcoming legislative elections in Palestine on an independent list called "Freedom."
