= Mahmoud Bakr Hijazi =

Palestinian militant (1936–2021)

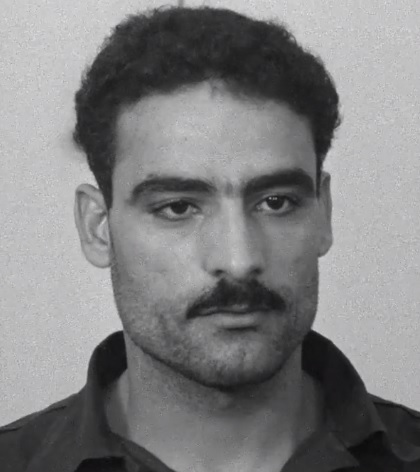
- Native name: محمود بكر حجازي
- Born: 1936; Jerusalem, Mandatory Palestine
- Died: 22 March 2021 (aged 84–85) Ramallah, State of Palestine
- Allegiance: Fatah; Palestine Liberation Organization

Mahmoud Bakr Hijazi (Arabic: محمود بكر حجازي; 1936 – 22 March 2021) was a Palestinian militant and one of the earliest guerrilla fighters of Fatah. In 1965, he became the first Fatah member to be captured by Israel. He was released on 17 April 1971 following a prisoner exchange between Israel and Fatah. 17 April was chosen by the Palestinian National Council as Palestinian Prisoner's Day in 1974 to commemorate Palestinian prisoners detained in Israel without charge to be released.

== Biography ==
Mahmoud Bakr Hijazi was born in Jerusalem in 1936 when the city was under British rule. He had six children, including three males and three females.

On 17 January 1965, Hijazi and six other Fatah guerrillas used explosives to destroy a highway bridge and blow up the Nehusha Water Institute near Beit Jibrin in the Hebron district, which Israeli forces were using as a main passageway. Following this, he secured the retreat of his fellow guerrillas and fended off Israeli troops that had surrounded him. Hijazi killed 20 Israeli soldiers before being wounded and captured.

Hijazi was incarcerated in Ayalon Prison in Ramla and was sentenced to death, but his death sentence eventually turned to a 30-year prison sentence. The Israel Prison Service allegedly attempted to assassinate him on numerous occasions through food poisoning. On 17 April 1971, Hijazi was released to Lebanon in exchange for a 59-year-old Israeli nightwatchman named Shmuel Rozenvasser who had been captured by Fatah on 1 January 1970. The date of his release was set as Palestinian Prisoner's Day in 1974 by the Palestinian National Council.

Hijazi died due to an illness on 22 March 2021.
