= Abdullah Barghouti =

Commander of Hamas' armed wing serving 67 life-term sentences

Abdullah Al-Barghouti
- Born: Abdullah Iyad Barghouti; 1972 (age 53–54)
- Military career
- Allegiance: Palestine (Hamas)
- Branch: Izz ad-Din al-Qassam Brigades

Abdullah Ghaleb Barghouti (Arabic: عبد الله البرغوثي, born 1972) is a Palestinian leading commander in Hamas' armed wing, the Izz al-Din al-Qassam Brigades, in the West Bank. He was also one of the organization's chief bomb makers. Barghouti is currently serving 67 life-term sentences in Israeli prison.

== Early life ==
Barghouti hails from the Barghouti clan based in the Ramallah area of the West Bank. His family is from the town of Beit Rima. Barghouti was born in Kuwait in 1972. He is a relative of Marwan Barghouti.

== Hamas ==
In 1999, Barghouti traveled to the West Bank where he joined the Hamas paramilitary group. He is considered by Ynet as Hamas' "engineer", and designed and built weapons for numerous attacks against Israeli civilians. Among the attacks he was involved in were the Sbarro restaurant suicide bombing, the double suicide bombing in the Ben Yehuda pedestrian mall, the Café Moment bombing, the Sheffield Club bombing, the Hebrew University bombing, the Allenby Street bus bombing, the Pi Glilot bombing attempt, and an attack on railway tracks in Lod in which he personally laid the explosive charge. A total of 66 Israelis were killed and 500 injured in attacks that Barghouti was involved in.

== Imprisonments ==
In late 2001, Barghouti was arrested by the Preventive Security Forces of the Palestinian Authority on Palestinian President Yasser Arafat's orders over involvement in the Sbarro restaurant bombing. Following a deterioration in relations between the PA and Israel in January 2002, Fatah leader Marwan Barghouti lobbied Jibril Rajoub, chief of the PA security forces, to release Abdullah Barghouti. He returned to Hamas activities.

Barghouti was arrested by the Israeli Shin Bet security service in March 2003. An Israeli military court sentenced him to 67 life terms plus 5,200 years in prison. The sentence was the longest given out in Israel's history. Barghouti is incarcerated at Gilboa Prison near Beit She'an. He is held in solitary confinement and is not allowed family visits.

The Israeli government refused to release Barghouti as part of the 2011 Gilad Shalit prisoner exchange. The Palestinian Authority has paid Barghouti a pension throughout his imprisonment.

== Novel ==
Barghouti is the author of Prince of the Shadow: Engineer on the Road, a novel composed in 2012 during his incarceration, which blends elements of memoir and fiction to recount his life, resistance, and years in solitary confinement. The narrative begins with a question from his daughter, asking “Who are you and why are you?” and proceeds to relate his responses, his struggle against imprisonment, and the inner life of a prisoner under occupation.
