= Ahmad Qatamesh =

Palestinian academic and writer (born 1950)

- Born: 1950 (age 75–76); Palestine
- Occupation: academic
- Known for: Amnesty International prisoner of conscience

Ahmad Qatamesh (born 1950) is a Palestinian academic and writer. He was accused by the Israeli government of being a leader of the militant group Popular Front for the Liberation of Palestine (PFLP) and was imprisoned from 1992 to 1998, at the time the longest detention without trial of a Palestinian prisoner. Israeli authorities stated that he instigated attacks against Israeli forces from prison.

== Writings ==
Ahmad Qatamesh authored his memoirs with the title "I shall not wear your Tarbush." The book recalls the 100 days of torture he underwent during interrogation in 1992 and times served in prison.

== 1992 detention without trial ==
In 1992, he was accused by the Israeli government of being a leader of the militant group Popular Front for the Liberation of Palestine (PFLP). He was then imprisoned without trial until 1998, which at the time was the longest detention without trial of a Palestinian prisoner. The Israeli security service Shin Bet accused Qatamesh of instigating attacks against Israelis, and an Israeli media outlet reported that he was suspected of instigating terrorist attacks even from inside his prison. Qatamesh's lawyer responded that Qatamesh "has always said that he is a writer and politician and that he will struggle politically, not violently, against the Israeli occupation and the so-called peace process."

A popular campaign against detention without trial by a coalition of Israeli leftist politicians and artists preceded his release, of which Qatamesh became the cause celebre. A spokesman for the government of Israeli Prime Minister Benjamin Netanyahu called the release a "goodwill gesture" made on the condition that Qatamesh and other prisoners "publicly renounce terrorism". Palestinian flags and a large PFLP banner adorned Katamesh's home when he returned from prison.

== 2011 arrest ==
Qatamesh later worked to find a political solution to the Israeli–Palestinian conflict, which he described as a "nightmare".

On 21 April 2011, he was arrested again and held without charge through a series of detention orders. According to Qatamesh's lawyer, he was interrogated for a total of only ten minutes during his detention, during which he was accused of continued involvement with the PFLP. Qatamesh stated that his involvement with the group had ended thirteen years before. His detention was renewed five more times; as of 29 April 2013, he was told that he would be held for at least four more months.

Amnesty International designated Qatamesh a prisoner of conscience and called for his release. The organization stated that "To Amnesty International's knowledge, he has never been involved with PFLP-affiliated armed groups or advocated violence ... the reasons for Ahmad Qatamesh's arrest and continued administrative detention are his peaceful expression, in his writing and teaching, of non-violent political views and the fact that he is considered a mentor for left-wing students and political activists, some of whom may be affiliated to the PFLP. As such, his detention may be part of the Israeli authorities' strategy to put pressure on the PFLP organisation."

Qatamesh was released on 26 December 2013.

== Subsequent detention ==
On 17 May 2017, Qatamesh was again placed under administrative detention. He has spent 14 years in prison, usually administrative detention without charge. He was last released from prison in August 2020 after seven months in administrative detention. According to his brother Khaled Qatamesh, "When he was released, Israeli authorities banned him from giving public lectures or participating in public gatherings," On 18 October 2021, he was arrested again because of a lecture given at Birzeit University, deemed to be "incitement".

== Family ==
Qatamesh has a wife, Suha Barghouti, and a daughter, Haneen (born c. 1989). Barghouti is active with several NGOs, including the Palestinian Red Crescent Society.
