= Embassy of Palestine, Manama =

Embassy of the State of Palestine in Bahrain سفارة دولة فلسطين لدى البحرين
- Location: Manama
- Ambassador: Arif Yusuf Saleh

Proposed deletion	This page was proposed for deletion by an editor in the past.

The Embassy of the State of Palestine in Bahrain (Arabic: سفارة دولة فلسطين لدى البحرين) is the diplomatic mission of the Palestine in Bahrain. It is located in Manama.

== See also ==
- List of diplomatic missions in Bahrain
- List of diplomatic missions of Palestine
