= Marwan Barghouti =

Palestinian politician (born 1959)

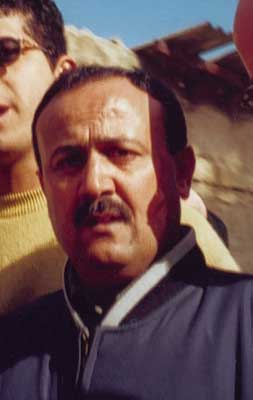
- Barghouti in 2001

Member of the Palestinian Legislative Council
- Incumbent
- Assumed office 7 March 1996
- Preceded by: Office established

Personal details
- Born: 6 June 1959 (age 67) Kobar, Ramallah, Jordanian-annexed West Bank
- Party: Fatah (1974–2005, 2006–present); Al-Mustaqbal (2005–2006)
- Spouse: Fadwa Barghouti (m. 1984)
- Children: 4, including Arab Barghouti
- Relatives: Nadeen Ayoub (ex–daughter-in-law)

Marwan Barghouti (Arabic: مروان البرغوثي, romanized: Marwān al-Bargūṯiyy; born 6 June 1959), sometimes known by the kunya Abu Al-Qassam (أبو القسام), is a Palestinian politician who has served as an elected legislator of the Palestinian Legislative Council (PLC). Barghouti is currently on life imprisonment by Israel due to his alleged involvement in deadly attacks during the Second Intifada.

Born in Kobar in the West Bank, he emerged as a prominent student organizer during the First Intifada. In 1994, he became Secretary-General of Fatah in the West Bank and was elected to the PLC in 1996. During the Second Intifada, Barghouti gained widespread national prominence leading Fatah's Tanzim faction. He publicly advocated for armed resistance against the Israeli military occupation while maintaining support for a two-state solution based on 1967 borders. Israel has accused Barghouti of having co-founded and lead the Al-Aqsa Martyrs' Brigades, which he had denied.

In 2002, he was captured during Operation Defensive Shield and subsequently convicted of five counts of murder and one of attempted murder. Barghouti declined to recognise the legitimacy of the court or enter a plea, but stated that he had no connection to the incidents. An Inter-Parliamentary Union report found that Barghouti was not given a fair trial and questioned the quality of the evidence. During his imprisonment, Barghouti has continued to be politically active. He was the lead author of the 2006 Palestinian Prisoners' Document, which proposed a political path to a two-state solution, and secured support from Hamas. He has organised education for fellow inmates, and led a hunger strike in 2017 that led to increased visitation rights. Since the October 2023 attacks and the Gaza war, he has been denied visits from his family and reportedly been severely beaten several times, leading to persistent damage to his health.

Despite his imprisonment, Barghouti consistently ranks as Palestinians' top choice in a Presidential election, ahead of both current Palestinian Authority president Mahmoud Abbas and leaders of Hamas. Several prominent supporters of a resumption of the Israel-Palestine peace process view Barghouti as the leader most capable to unify the Palestinians and negotiate a compromise with Israel. He has been referred to as "the Palestinian Mandela". There have been several attempts to secure his release through negotiations.

== Early life, education and expulsion ==
Barghouti was born in the village of Kobar near Ramallah in the West Bank. Like his distant cousin Mustafa Barghouti, a fellow Palestinian political leader, he belongs to the extended Barghouti family. His younger brother Muqbel described him as "a naughty and rebellious boy."

Barghouti turned eight during the Six-Day War in 1967, when Israel occupied the West Bank. According to The Economist, Marwan's "neighbours were beaten up or arrested for flying Palestinian flags. Military bases and Jewish settlements sprang up around their village. Israeli soldiers shot dead the family dog for barking."

Barghouti joined Fatah at age 15, and he was a co-founder of the Fatah Youth Movement (Shabiba) on the West Bank. That year he was first imprisoned by Israel. At 18, he was imprisoned again. He later wrote that during the subsequent interrogation, he was forced to strip naked, spread his legs, and was struck on the genitals so hard that he lost consciousness. He completed his secondary education and received a high school diploma while serving a four-year term in jail, where he became fluent in Hebrew.

Barghouti enrolled at Birzeit University in 1983, though arrest and subsequent exile meant that he did not receive his bachelor's degree (History and Political Science) until 1994. He earned a master's degree in International Relations, also from Birzeit, in 1998. As an undergraduate, he was active in student politics on behalf of Fatah and headed the Birzeit Student Council. In 1984, he married Fadwa Ibrahim, a fellow student. Fadwa studied law and was a prominent advocate in her own right on behalf of Palestinian prisoners, before becoming the leading campaigner for her husband's release from his current jail term. The couple would go on to have four children. While still a student leader, Barghouti was jailed for a third time, causing him to miss the birth of his eldest son. On 14 May 1987, Israel expelled Barghouti from Palestine, accusing him and two other youth leaders of encouraging opposition to the military occupation. In exile he became involved with Fatah's senior leadership, which was based in Tunis.

== First Intifada ==
From exile, during the First Intifada, Barghouti continued to maintain contacts among activists in the West Bank. He simultaneously built relationships with the older generation of Fatah activists, who had waged their struggle from exile for more than three decades. He was elected to Fatah's Revolutionary Council, the movement's internal parliament, in 1989. When he was allowed to return to Palestine in April 1994 as a result of the Oslo Accords, Barghouti found that he was able to bridge the divide between the two groups.

Although he was a strong supporter of the peace process, he doubted that Israel was committed to it. In 1996, he was elected to the Palestinian Legislative Council for the district of Ramallah. Barghouti campaigned against corruption in Arafat's administration and human rights violations by its security services. He participated in diplomacy and built relationships with a number of Israeli politicians, and with leaders of Israel's peace movement. A series of peace conferences in the wake of the Oslo accords featured "heated discussions." When Meir Shitreet fell ill during a peace conference in Italy, Shitreet said that Barghouti sat at his bedside through the night. In 1998 he attended a meeting with members of the Israeli Knesset, referring to those present as friends, and called to "strengthen this peace process." Haim Oron, a former Israeli cabinet minister, recalled that "he spoke about the right of the Palestinians, and when I spoke about the right of Jews, he understood". His assistant has claimed that Barghouti never refused to meet any Israeli.

By the late 1990s, Palestinians had become frustrated with the lack of progress toward an independent state that they felt had been promised by the Oslo accords, and by the privations of life under occupation. There were frequent demonstrations by civil society and political groups. According to Diana Buttu, "Marwan was somebody who was present at each and every protest for weeks and weeks and weeks on end. It became very clear that we were just never going to see freedom." Barghouti met with the central committees of almost every Israeli party, the journalist Gideon Levy has claimed, to warn them that, with an impasse in the peace process, the situation was tending toward violence. The formal position occupied by Barghouti was Secretary-General of Fatah in the West Bank. By the summer of 2000, particularly after the Camp David summit failed, Barghouti was disillusioned and said that popular protests and "new forms of military struggle" would be features of the "next Intifada."

== Second Intifada ==
=== Outbreak of Second Intifada and political leadership ===
In September 2000, the Second Intifada began. Barghouti became increasingly popular as a leader of demonstrations, as a spokesperson for Palestinian interests, and as leader of the Tanzim, a grouping of younger activists within Fatah who had taken up arms. Barghouti described himself as "a politician, not a military man." Barghouti led marches to Israeli checkpoints, where riots broke out against Israeli soldiers and spurred on Palestinians in speeches at funerals and demonstrations, advocating the use of force to expel Israel from the West Bank and Gaza Strip. He has stated that, "I, and the Fatah movement to which I belong, strongly oppose attacks and the targeting of civilians inside Israel, our future neighbor, I reserve the right to protect myself, to resist the Israeli occupation of my country and to fight for my freedom" and has said, "I still seek peaceful coexistence between the equal and independent countries of Israel and Palestine based on full withdrawal from Palestinian territories occupied in 1967."

As the Palestinian death toll in the Second Intifada mounted, Barghouti called for Palestinians to target Israeli soldiers and settlers in the West Bank and Gaza, but not within Israel.

Israel has accused Barghouti of having co-founded and lead the Al-Aqsa Martyrs' Brigades during this period, which he has denied. Israel attempted to assassinate him in 2001. That August, Israeli forces fired two missiles from an illegal West Bank settlement at a convoy of cars in Ramallah and injured Barghouti's bodyguard. At the time, Israeli security sources claimed that they had intended to kill another Fatah operative. The then-head of Shin Bet subsequently claimed to have made two attempts to assassinate Barghouti. Barghouti went into hiding.

=== Israeli arrest, interrogation and trial ===
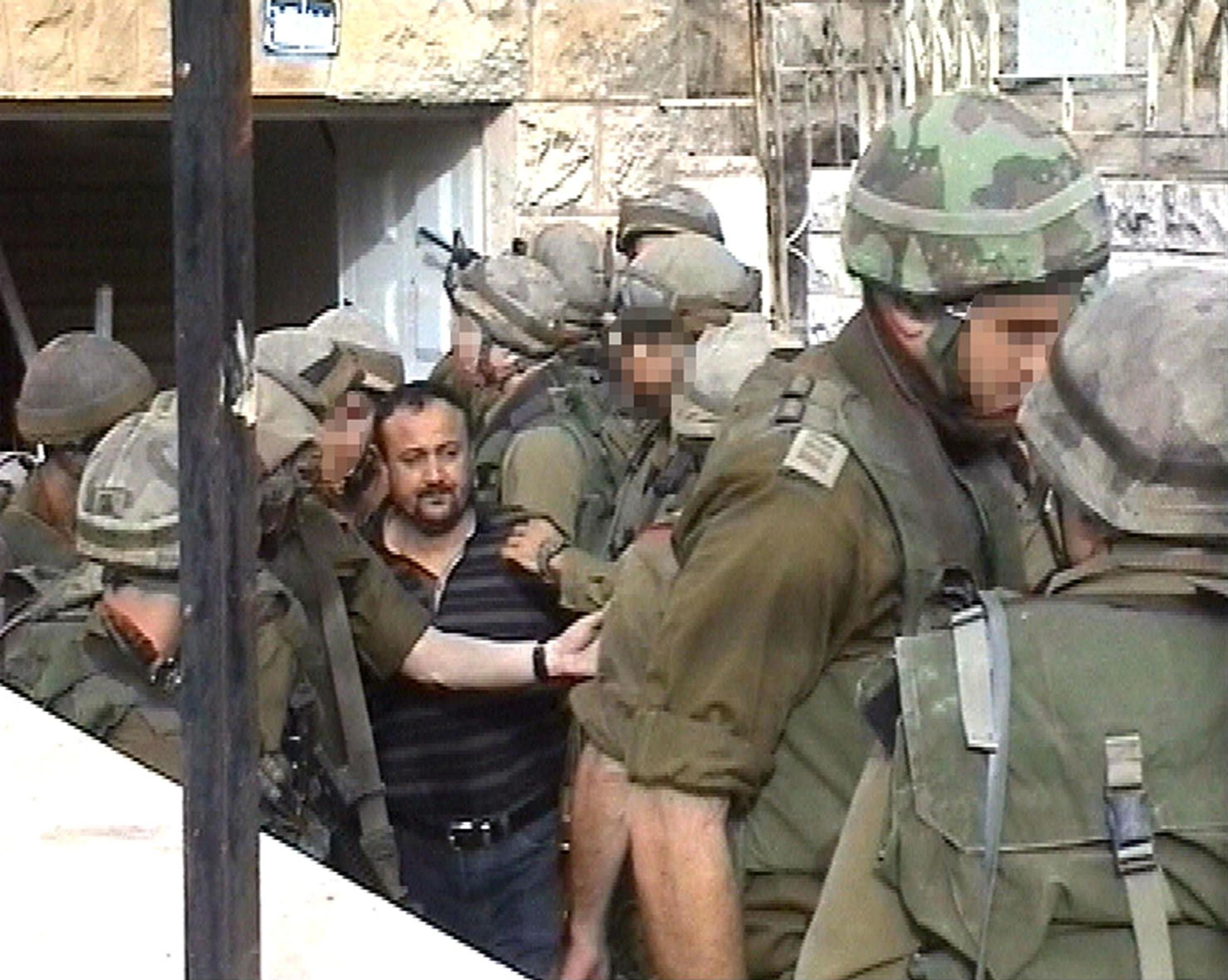
Barghouti being arrested by Israeli soldiers in Ramallah during Operation Defensive Shield

Barghouti was captured on 15 April 2002 by Israeli soldiers who travelled to his location in an armoured ambulance. He was transferred to the Moscovia Detention Centre. On 18 April, Barghouti was reported to have declined to cooperate with his interrogators, and to have been allowed to communicate with his lawyer. He was then denied the right to see his lawyer for the next month, except for an occasion on which they were not allowed to discuss the investigation. The next time he was able to talk freely with his lawyer, Barghouti described having been subject to severe sleep deprivation and insufficient food. He described the torture, in the form of the shabeh method, in a later book, 1000 Days In Solitary Jail. He said that he was forced to sit on a chair with nails protruding into his back for hours at a time. Simon Foreman, the lawyer commissioned by the Inter-Parliamentary Union to report on the trial, has said "the witnesses whose statements were used to accuse [Barghouti], many of them made the same kind of statements and those allegations were disregarded, openly disregarded by the courts." Barghouti has also stated that the interrogators threatened to kill him and his eldest son. He has written that during his pre-trial detention, in addition to Moscovia, he was held for periods at Camp 1391 and the Petah Tikva prison.

=== Charges, verdict and sentences ===
Israel filed its indictment on 14 August and Barghouti's trial commenced on 5 September. Barghouti was charged with 26 charges of murder and attempted murder stemming from attacks carried out by the al-Aqsa Martyrs' Brigades on Israeli civilians and soldiers. Barghouti refused to present a defense to the charges brought against him, maintaining throughout that the trial was illegal and illegitimate. He stressed that he supported armed resistance to the Israeli occupation, but condemned attacks on civilians inside Israel. According to the case argued by Israel at his trial, he had supported and authorized such attacks. On 20 May 2004, he was convicted of five counts of murder: authorizing and organizing the murder of Georgios Tsibouktzakis (a.k.a. Father Germanos, a Greek Orthodox monk-priest), a shooting adjacent to Giv'at Ze'ev in which a civilian was killed, and the Seafood Market attack in Tel Aviv in which three civilians were killed. In addition, he was convicted of attempted murder for a failed car bomb attack near Malha Mall that exploded prematurely, resulting in the deaths of two suicide bombers, and for membership and activity in a terrorist organization. He was acquitted of 21 counts of murder in 33 other attacks as no proof was brought to link Barghouti directly with the specific decisions of the local leadership of the Tanzim to carry out these particular attacks. Following the verdict, Barghouti shouted in Hebrew, "This is a court of occupation that I do not recognize. A day will come when you will be ashamed of these accusations. I have no more connection to these charges than you, the judges, do." On 6 June 2004, he was sentenced to the maximum possible punishment for his convictions: five cumulative life sentences for the murders and an additional 40 years, consisting of 20 years each for attempted murder and for membership and activity in a terrorist organization. The Israeli verdict against him in effect removed Arafat's only political rival.

=== Criticism of the trial ===
The Inter-Parliamentary Union found that the "numerous breaches of international law" to which Barghouti was subjected "make it impossible to conclude that Mr. Barghouti was given a fair trial." The criticisms raised by Simon Foreman, the report's author, included the court's failure to consider the public allegations of torture; its authorisation of incommunicado detention; prejudicial statements by the presiding judge; the transportation of Barghouti to Israel contrary to the Fourth Geneva Convention; and the poor evidence for guilt. Foreman wrote, "According to the prosecution, only 21 of the prosecution witnesses were actually in a position to testify directly regarding Mr. Barghouti's role in these attacks. But none of these 21 individuals in fact accused him. About 12 of them explicitly told the court that he was not involved." Concerning "material" evidence, Barghouti's lawyer told Foreman that "no document originated by Mr. Barghouti had implicated him in the acts of which he was being accused."

== Campaign for release ==
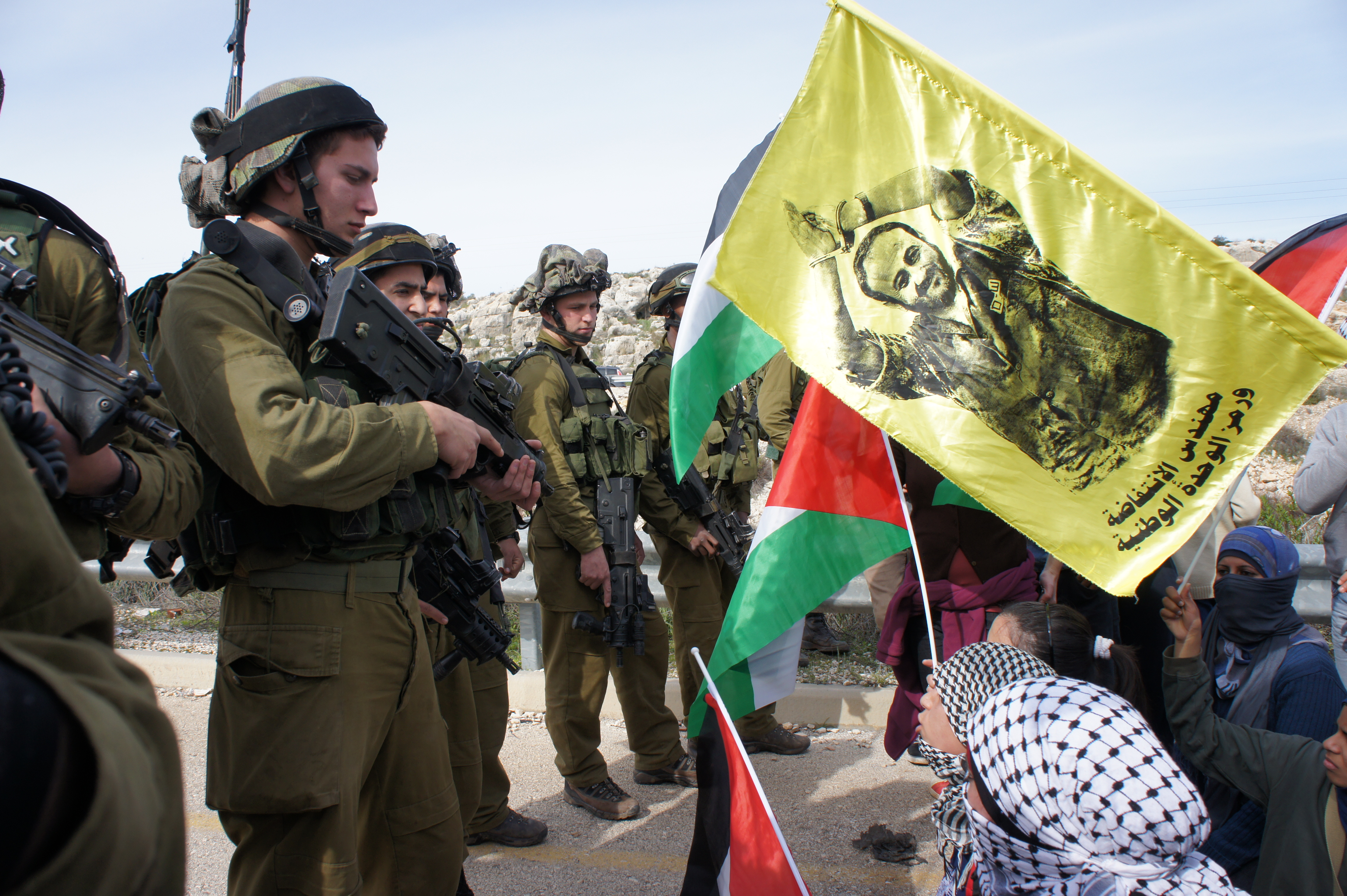
A flag in support of Marwan Barghouti at a demonstration at Kafr ad-Dik.

Fadwa Barghouti began campaigning for her husband's release the day he was arrested. The International Campaign to Free Marwan Barghouti and All Palestinian Prisoners was launched in 2013 from Nelson Mandela's former cell on Robben Island. The campaign was launched by Fadwa and Ahmed Kathrada, who was jailed alongside Mandela at the Rivonia Trial. Other supporters included include prominent Palestinian figures, members of European Parliament and the Israeli group Gush Shalom.

In August 2023, Barghouti's wife Fadwa held meetings with senior officials and diplomats across the world, including Jordanian Foreign Minister Ayman Safadi, to advocate for her husband's release and position him as a successor to Abbas. According to Al-Sharq al-Awsat, Barghouti would run in Palestinian presidential elections and maintained a polling lead over all other candidates. Near the end of 2025, a diverse group signed an open letter calling for his release. The 200 signers were called "leading cultural figures" by The Guardian as it included well known writers and musicians. Among the signatories were notable individuals such as British actor Stephen Fry, American musician Paul Simon, and actresses Hannah Einbinder and Ilana Glazer. The "Free Marwan" campaign was organized in response to Barghouti's decades-long imprisonment and harsh detention conditions, representing one of the most prominent international efforts in recent years to secure his release.

=== South African Involvement ===
In 2026, South Africa's President Cyril Ramaphosa, a former anti-apartheid leader, endorsed the campaign to free Barghouti, prompting criticism from the South African Zionist Federation. Also in 2026 Marwan's son Arab appeared onstage with the band Massive Attack on several occasions in order to call for his father's release and freedom for Palestine. He garnered support from the Spanish Prime Minister Pedro Sánchez.

Barghouti has often drawn comparisons to Nelson Mandela from supporters. Reuters reported that some see Barghouti "as a Palestinian Nelson Mandela, the man who could galvanize a drifting and divided national movement if only he were set free by Israel." Critics of Barghouti dispute the appropriateness of the comparison to Mandela. According to The Jerusalem Post, "Palestinian journalists have rarely referred to Barghouti in these terms".

A lawyer for Barghouti spoke to Mandela personally in 2002 and testified that the anti-apartheid leader had told him: "What is happening to Barghouti is exactly the same as what happened to me. The government tried to de-legitimise the African National Congress and its armed struggle by putting me on trial." Opponents of Barghouti have questioned whether the attribution of the quote to Mandela is accurate. Mandela publicly neither confirmed nor disavowed the attributed words before he died.

Some former comrades of Mandela and other leaders of the South African anti-apartheid struggle have endorsed the comparison, including Desmond Tutu and Ahmed Kathrada.

=== Israeli Opinions ===
In 2008, 45% of Israelis supported the release of Barghouti, while 51% opposed. Another approach is to suggest that Israel's freeing of Barghouti would be an excellent show of good faith in the peace process. Some prominent Israelis have called for Barghouti's release, citing his unique ability to unite Palestinians. These include Ami Ayalon, Efraim Halevy, Meir Shitreet, and both Yossi Beilin and Haim Oron, two former ministers on the left of Israeli politics. Several IDF officers involved in Barghouti's 2002 capture have taken a similar view.

Every Israeli administration since Barghouti's imprisonment has declined to release him. Ayalon claimed in 2024 that "You will not find anybody in our current political community that has any interest in releasing Marwan Barghouti." Figures who have spoken in opposition to his release include former Defense Minister Moshe Ya’alon, Avi Dichter, and former Foreign Minister Silvan Shalom, who called Barghouti "an assassin who has blood on his hands."

This view gained popularity among the Israeli left after the 2005 disengagement from the Gaza Strip. Still others, operating from a realpolitik perspective, have pointed out that allowing Barghouti to re-enter Palestinian politics could serve to bolster Fatah against gains in Hamas' popularity.

=== History of negotiations ===
In 2004, Israel's ambassador to Washington Danny Ayalon proposed, with the "tacit agreement" of Ariel Sharon, that Israel would free Barghouti in exchange for the Israeli spy Jonathan Pollard, who was imprisoned by the United States. Secretary of State Condoleezza Rice rejected the request. In 2006, there were conflicting claims concerning proposals for Barghouti's release. A Saudi newspaper reported that Condoleezza Rice had proposed such a step to Israel, with no mention of a quid pro quo, but Ehud Olmert denied that the idea had been raised in talks with the United States. He reportedly continued to oppose Barghouti's release in 2007.

In January 2007, Israeli Deputy Prime Minister Shimon Peres declared that he would pardon Barghouti if elected president. Peres was elected, but issued no pardon.

Hamas sought the inclusion of Barghouti in the 2011 prisoner exchange deal that led to the release of Gilad Shalit, but Israel refused to include him.

During the prisoner swap negotiations in 2024 and 2025 that arose from the Gaza War, Hamas said that Barghouti was at the top of their list of prisoners whom they wanted Israel to free. Israel again refused. The Economist reported that Mahmoud Abbas, who was expected to face a political challenge from Barghouti on the latter's release, "urged Qatari mediators to remove Barghouti's name from the list of prisoner exchanges." In January 2025, an Israeli government official denied reports that Barghouti was set to be released and exiled to Turkey.

== Political activity in prison ==
=== 2005 and 2006 Palestinian elections ===
Yasser Arafat died in November 2004, and the Palestinian Authority called a presidential election for January 2005. Barghouti announced from his isolation cell that he would contest the election, challenging interim-President Mahmoud Abbas, a long-time Fatah administrator of Arafat's generation. Fadwa registered her husband's candidacy as an independent on 1 December.

The Israeli government came to know that two of Barghouti's closest confidantes – Fadwa and advisor Qadura Fares – privately opposed Barghouti's decision to stand, and decided to allow the two to meet with Barghouti to press their case, breaking two years in which he had been denied such contact. His candidacy was also criticised by Fatah leaders as a threat to the movement's unity. His campaign manager announced Barghouti's decision to withdraw from the race on 12 December. In a letter read at the announcement, Barghouti accused Fatah's leadership of having grown "old, weak and alienated" from the rank and file. In 2016, Fares said that he believed his advice had been a mistake.

In 2006 Israeli media reported that MK Haim Oron had met with Barghouti in prison dozens of times, and had carried messages back and forth between Barghouti and Prime Minister Ehud Olmert.

=== Split from Fatah ===
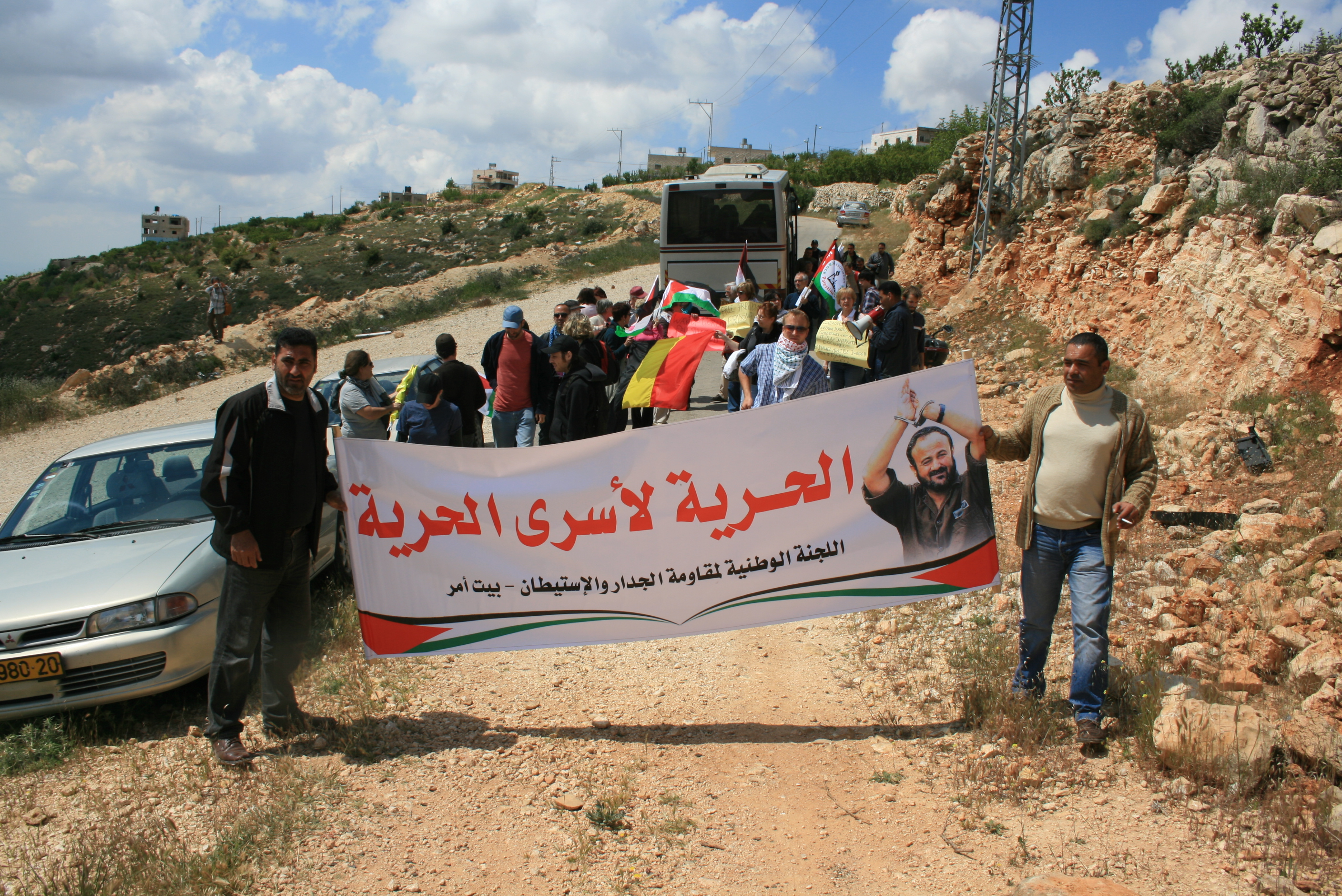
A banner in support of Marwan Barghouti at a demonstration at Beit Ummar.

On 14 December 2005, Barghouti announced that he had formed a new political party, al-Mustaqbal ("The Future"), mainly composed of members of Fatah's "Young Guard", who repeatedly expressed frustration with the entrenched corruption in the party. The list, which was presented to the Palestinian Authority's central elections committee on that day, included Mohammed Dahlan, Qadura Fares, Samir Mashharawi and Jibril Rajoub.

The split followed Barghouti's earlier refusal of Mahmoud Abbas' offer to be second on the Fatah party's parliamentary list, behind Palestinian Prime Minister Ahmed Qurei. Barghouti had actually topped the list.

=== Prisoners' Document and other activism ===
On 11 May 2006, Palestinian leaders held in Israeli prisons released the National Conciliation Document of the Prisoners. The document was a proposal initiated by Marwan Barghouti and leaders of Hamas, the PFLP, the Palestinian Islamic Jihad and the DFLP that proposed a basis upon which a coalition government should be formed in the Palestinian Legislative Council. This came as a result of the political stalemate in the Palestinian territories that followed Hamas' election to the PLC in January 2006. Crucially, the document also called for negotiation with the state of Israel in order to achieve lasting peace. The document quickly gained popular currency and is now considered the bedrock upon which a national unity government should be achieved. According to Haaretz, Barghouti, although not officially represented in the negotiations of a Palestinian unity government in February 2007, played a major role in mediating between Hamas and Fatah and formulating the compromise reached on 8 February 2007. In 2009, he was elected to party leadership at the Fatah Conference in Bethlehem.

In March 2010, Barghouti completed a doctorate in political science. He had been accepted by Cairo University and the Arab Academy for Research and Studies in 1999, prior to his arrest in 2002. His doctoral thesis was titled "The Legislative and Political Performance of the Palestinian Legislative Council and its Contribution to the Democratic Process in Palestine from 1996 to 2008." Barghouti was reported to have taught a master's level course in "Israel Studies" to hundreds of fellow Palestinian prisoners while incarcerated. One former inmate, Abu Muhsin, said he had studied under Barghouti during his 23-year sentence, ultimately earning a bachelor's degree in political science from the Hebrew University of Jerusalem and a master's degree from Al-Quds University. Barghouti's attainment of a doctorate in 2010 enabled him to teach university-level courses in prison. Barghouti had organised a programme to provide education to his fellow prisoners. In a 2014 interview he stated:

I teach and lecture on a variety of topics in various disciplines, including at the university level... There are dozens of prisoners who never had the chance to be educated at the secondary or university level and who want to pursue their education. I have been in charge of teaching them and we’ve achieved good results in both foreign language instruction and university syllabuses with the help of some of my fellow detainees.

Barghouti declined to testify before an Israeli court in January 2012, but used the opportunity of his appearance to say that "an Israeli withdrawal to the 1967 lines and the establishment of a Palestinian state will bring an end to the Israeli-Palestinian conflict," according to Haaretz's Avi Issacharoff. That March, in a letter from prison, Barghouti called for a new wave of civil resistance against the occupation, and for the Palestinian Authority to end all coordination with Israel. He wrote "Large-scale popular resistance at this stage serves the cause of our people." Barghouti has frequently been punished for releasing statements through internment in solitary confinement.

In November 2014, months after more than 2,000 Palestinians were killed in the 2014 Gaza War, Barghouti urged the Palestinian Authority to end security cooperation with Israel and called for a Third Intifada against Israel. In 2016, a plan for confronting the occupation, purportedly authored by Barghouti and smuggled from prison, was presented by an ally. The plans hinged on "mass disobedience" and demonstrations of hundreds of thousands of people according to the Economist's 1843 Magazine.

=== 2017 hunger strike ===
In April 2017, he organized a hunger strike of Palestinian security prisoners in Israeli jails. In an op-ed for The New York Times, Barghouti said that the hunger strikers sought to end the "torture, inhumane and degrading treatment, and medical negligence" to which prisoners were subject. A list of demands issued by the strikers included access to telephones to communicate with their families, increased visitation rights, and a series of steps to address medical negligence.

On 7 May, the Israel Prison Service released videos allegedly showing Barghouti hiding in the toilet stall of his cell while eating cookies and candy, then trying to flush the wrappers. The videos were recorded on 27 April and on 5 May, a period during which almost 1,000 of Barghouti's fellow prisoners were refusing all food. Anonymous sources in the prison service confirmed the authenticity of the videos, saying that the food was made available to Barghouti to test his adherence to the hunger strike. Barghouti's attorney refused to respond to the videos, while his wife claimed that they had been "fabricated" to discredit him. Israeli media reported that this was not Barghouti's first time being caught secretly breaking a hunger strike, and that in 2004 he had been photographed hiding a plate after eating off it in his cell. According to Haaretz's Amos Harel, among Palestinians, the episode "only strengthened his image as a leader who is feared by Israel – which resorts to ugly tricks in order to trip him up,". The hunger strike ended after Israel conceded a second family visit for each prisoner per month.

=== Subsequent activism ===
Barghouti intended to contest the Palestinian Presidential elections slated for 2021, but they were cancelled by President Abbas, citing Israel's refusal to permit voting in East Jerusalem. Immediately prior to the cancelation, a poll suggested that Barghouti would go on to win the Presidency, with more than double Abbas's support, and significantly more than that of Ismail Haniyeh. Barghouti remains the most popular Palestinian leader. In each of the six polls conducted by the Palestinian Centre for Policy and Survey Research between September 2023 and May 2025, Barghouti came out ahead of a Hamas candidate when Palestinians were asked who they would vote for as president in a two-way race.

A collection of Barghout's writing from prison is slated to be published as an English-language book. At Fatah's eighth congress, in May 2026, Barghouti was reelected to the movement's eighteen-member Central Committee, securing more votes than all other candidates. It was the first such congress held since 2016.

== Conditions of imprisonment and alleged mistreatment ==
Barghouti was held in solitary confinement for three years following his 2002 detention and has frequently been returned to solitary confinement since. Since 7 October 2023, Barghouti has been interred in solitary confinement. Shortly after that date, the governor of Ofer Prison ordered Barghouti to kneel before the governor, according to his son, Arab Barghouti.

In December 2023, Barghouti was beaten on several occasions in Ayalon prison, according to his lawyer, and in one case was "dragged on the floor naked in front of other prisoners." Around this time, according to his family, Barghouti was held in the dark, with loud music playing into his cell for days at a time. The Public Committee Against Torture in Israel stated in February 2024 that Barghouti had been subjected to treatment amounting to torture, which they said had "become standard across all detention facilities since 7 October."

In March 2024, Barghouti told his lawyers, he was dragged to an area of Megiddo prison without security cameras and assaulted with batons by prison guards. He bled from his nose as he was dragged across the floor by his handcuffs, before guards beaten unconscious." A lawyer who visited shortly afterward found that Marwan was struggling to see out of his right eye as a result of an assault. As of May 2024, Barghouti was interned in a small, dark isolation cell, unable to tend to his injuries, including a shoulder injury from being dragged with his hands cuffed behind his back.

In September 2024, guards again attacked Barghouti, this time in an isolation cell in Megiddo Prison. The assault left Barghouti bleeding from his right ear, with an injury to his right arm, and severe back pain." The Israel Prison Service announced in October 2024 that they had rejected two complaints of mistreatment by Barghouti over the past year on the grounds that there had been no violation of the law.

In August 2025, Israel’s National Security Minister Itamar Ben Gvir, who oversees prisons, released a video in which he was shown entering Marwan’s cell and threatening him. Ben Gvir showed Marwan a photograph of an electric chair on his phone, and told him “this is your fate”. The next month, Barghouti was beaten unconscious again according to witnesses who spoke to his family, this time during a transfer between the Megiddo and Ganot prisons. Barghouti was allegedly placed on the floor in handcuffs and kicked in the head, back and chest. The Israel Prison service stated that the claims were false.

In January 2026, Minister Ben-Gvir called for Barghouti to be executed. In March 2026, prison guards forced Barghouti to the ground in his cell, and their dog "repeatedly attacked him", according to Marwan's lawyer. During a transfer from Megiddo to Ganot prison that same month, he was beaten again. At Ganot, in April 2026, he severely beaten and left bleeding without medical attention for two hours, according to his lawyer. By that time, Marwan's son Arab estimated based on lawyers' reports that his father had lost perhaps 10 kilograms (22 pounds) since October 2023.

== Personal life ==
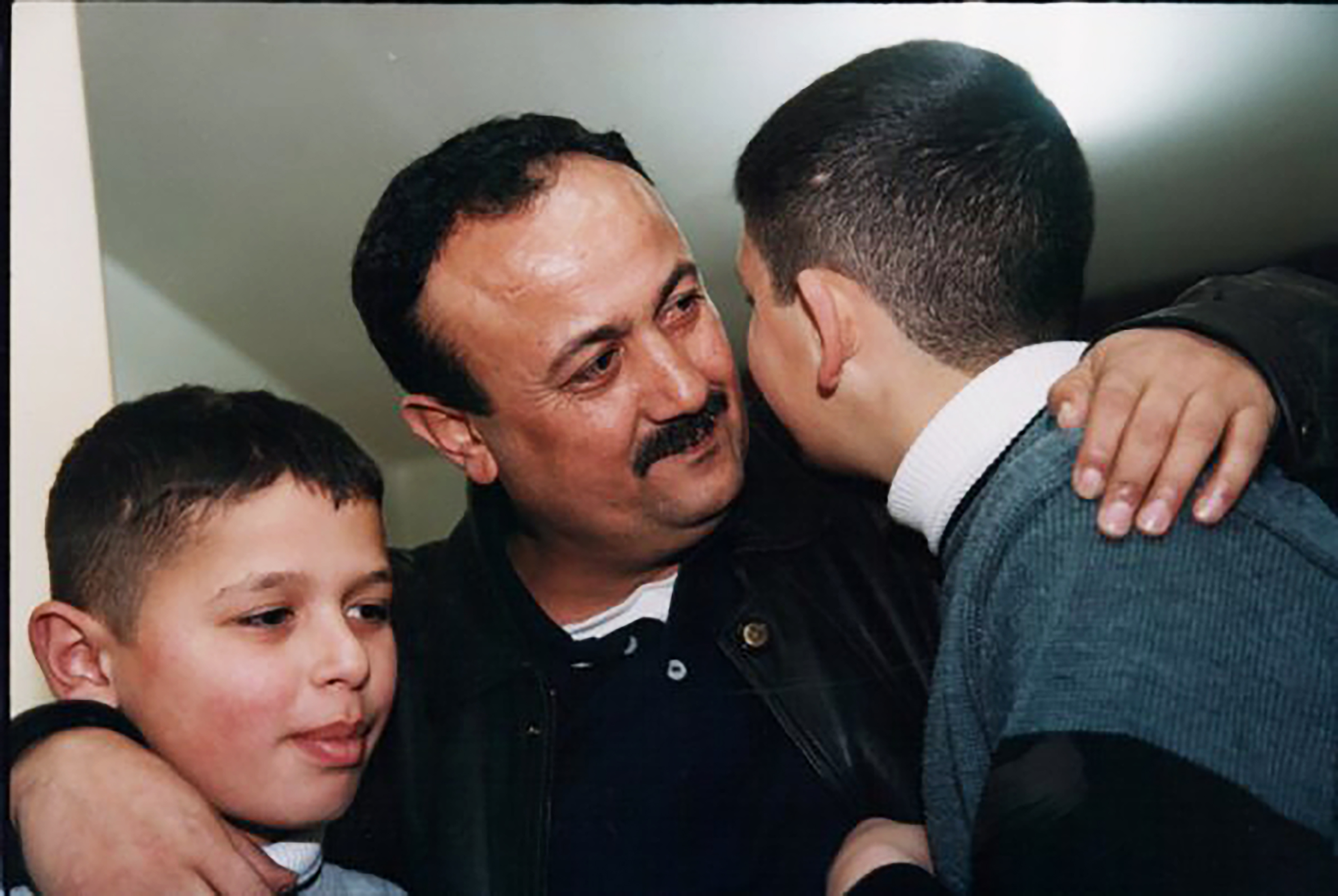
Barghouti with two of his sons in 2002

On 21 October 1984, Barghouti married Fadwa Barghouti. They have four children and six grandchildren (as of 2024). Marwan and Fadwa's youngest son, Arab Barghouti, is a prominent campaigner for his father's freedom. In a 2025 interview with Alastair Campbell and Rory Stewart on their podcast, Leading, Arab revealed that his father was a fan of Real Madrid CF.

Marwan's former daughter-in-law, Nadeen Ayoub, who married his son Sharaf in 2016, participated in the 2025 Miss Universe contest as Miss Palestine. By the time Ayoub took part in the contest, her marriage to Sharaf had ended.

== Books ==
- ألف يوم في زنزانة العزل الانفرادي (“A Thousand Days in the Cell of Solitary Confinement”).

== See also ==
- Gaza war hostage crisis
