= Sufian Abu Zaida =

Palestinian politician

- سفيان أبو زايدة

Minister of Prisoner Affairs
- In office February 2005 – 2006
- Preceded by: Hisham Abdel Razeq
- Succeeded by: Said Abu Ali

Minister of Civil Affairs
- In office February 2005 – 2006
- Preceded by: Mohammed Dahlan
- Succeeded by: Mohammed Dahlan

Personal details
- Born: 1960 (age 65–66) Jabalia, northern Gaza
- Party: Fatah
- Education: Bachelor of Arts in Social Science, Al-Azhar University, Palestine (1999) Masters in Conflict Resolution, University of Bradford, UK (2001) Doctor of Philosophy (PhD) in Middle-Eastern Politics, University of Exeter, UK (2005)
- Alma mater: Al-Azhar University; University of Bradford; University of Exeter
- Occupation: Politician Scholar Lecturer
- Website: Facebook

Sufian Abu Zaida (Arabic: سفيان أبو زايدة), also spelled Sufyan Abu Zayda, is a senior Palestinian politician, a member of Fatah and the Palestine Liberation Organization, and a former Minister of Prisoner Affairs at the Palestinian Authority. From February, 2005 until the establishment of the Hamas government, Abu Zayda served in the government of the Palestinian Authority as Minister of Prisoners and ex-Prisoners' Affairs and Minister of Civil Affairs. As Deputy Minister of the Ministry of Civil Affairs (1999–2004), his responsibilities focused on coordination with the Israeli government regarding all the civil aspects of the agreements, especially the movement of Palestinians, international crossing points and coordination between Palestinian ministries and their Israeli counterparts. Among many other activities, he has been active in the Israeli-Palestinian Geneva Initiative, in which "moderates" from both sides argue that it is possible to find a just two-state solution. Abu Zaida is also an academic scholar and lecturer at several Palestinian and International Universities and the Director of the Masters programs at Al-Quds University.

Like many Palestinian political leaders, Abu Zaida served twelve years in an Israeli prisons (1981–1993) and was known at the time as the Palestinian prisoners spokesman. He speaks Hebrew fluently and has a strong knowledge of Israeli politics.

Abu Zayda seved as a mediator between Israel and Hamas prior to the 7 October attacks.

== Early life ==
Sufian Abu Zaida was born in 1960 in Jabalia, northern Gaza. His family was exiled in 1948 from the village of Kfar Burayr where Kibbutz Bror Hayil now stands, near the Gaza border. Soon after graduating from high school, Abu Zaida joined Fatah movement, formerly the Palestinian National Liberation Movement, a Palestinian nationalist political party and the largest faction of the confederated multi-party Palestine Liberation Organization (PLO). Abu Zaida was arrested by Israeli forces at age 21 and accused of membership in Fatah resistance organization and recruiting to Fatah.

== Academic career ==
Dr. Abu Zaida received his Bachelor of Arts in Social Science from Al-Azhar University, Palestine in 1999. He then received a Masters in Conflict Resolution from University of Bradford, UK in 2001. Dr. Abu Zaida then obtained his Doctor of Philosophy (PhD) in Middle-Eastern Politics from University of Exeter, UK in 2005.

Dr. Abu Zaida is an active scholar, author and lecturer at several regional and international universities and research institutes. He is considered to be an expert regarding the Israeli-Palestinian Conflict and the Israeli political system. Some of the academic positions he has held include:

- Director of the Masters Program at Al-Quds University, Palestine (2006–2007)
- Lecturer in the Department of Political Science and course master of "Israeli Political System" at Birzeit University, Palestine (2009–2014)
- Lecturer at Alquds University, Jerusalem (2009–2014) and course master of the following courses: "Religion and the State in Israel", "Israeli Political System", "The Role of Army in Israel", "The Education System in Israel", and "The Israeli Wars"
- Visiting Scholar at New York University (2016), "The Peace Process between Arabs and Israel"

Dr. Abu Zaida also publishes press articles on a weekly basis commenting on contemporary Palestinian, Israeli and International political events.

== Political career ==
Since the establishment of the Palestinian Authority in 1994, he served as Director General in the Ministry of Planning and International Cooperation, responsible for Israeli affairs. During this period, he was a member of the Steering Committee of the People-to-People program (part of the Oslo Accords and funded by the Government of Norway) and director of the Palestinian committee, where his responsibilities included the development of relations between the two peoples in order to support the peace process. During the same period, Abu Zayda served as a member of the Palestinian delegation responsible for negotiations regarding the release of Palestinian prisoners held in Israeli prisons.

== Mediator role ==
Before the 7 October attacks, Abu Zayda served as a mediator between Israel and Hamas.

== Political views ==
Abu Zaida is a senior leader in Fatah and was a member of the Fatah Revolutionary Council until May 31, 2014, when he was removed from the movement because of his public criticism of President Abbas' way of rule.

Abu Zaida stated in many occasions that there is lack of Separation of powers and that President Abbas took to himself too much power. Furthermore, Abu Zaida claims there is a lack of minimal democratic rights in Palestine since no presidential elections had been conducted since 2006 in the Palestinian Authority.
