= Senate Resolution 852 =

Proposed legislation in the United States

- Long title: A resolution requesting information on Israel's human rights practices pursuant to section 502B(c) of the Foreign Assistance Act of 1961.

Legislative history
- Introduced in the Senate by Chris Van Hollen on September 14, 2026; Committee consideration by United States Senate Committee on Foreign Relations

Senate Resolution 852 is a failed 2026 United States congressional resolution to require the US State Department to produce an unclassified report to Congress on Israel's human rights practices and violence in the West Bank, including the killings of American citizens.

The resolution was introduced by Senator Chris Van Hollen and co-sponsored by several Democratic senators in September 2026 under section 502B of the Foreign Assistance Act, which allows senators to demand human rights reports on countries receiving American military aid. As a privileged resolution, it must be brought to a floor vote within 10 days if a committee fails to consider it.

== Background ==
According to Van Hollen, nine American citizens have been killed in the West Bank since January 1, 2022:

Americans killed in the West Bank since 2022
Date	Name	Age	City
January 12, 2022	Omar Assad	78	Jilijliya
May 11, 2022	Shireen Abu Akleh	51	Jenin
January 19, 2024	Tawfic Abdel Jabbar	17	Highway 60
February 10, 2024	Mohammad Ahmad Alkhdour	17	Biddu
September 6, 2024	Ayşenur Ezgi Eygi	26	Beita
April 2025	Amer Mohammad Saada Rabee	14	Turmus Ayya
July 2025	Sayfollah Kamel Musallet	20	Sinjil
August 2025	Khamis Ayyad	40	Silwad
February 2026	Nasrallah Abu Siyam	19	Mukhmas

In 2024, a vote on a resolution was forced by Bernie Sanders seeking a State Department report on human rights violations in Gaza received votes from 11 Democrats.

== Provisions ==
The resolution would require the State Department to submit a report to Congress within 30 days on the deaths of nine American citizens in the West Bank involving Israeli security forces or Israeli settlers since 2022, along with the Israeli detention of Palestinian children. The majority of American security assistance to Israel would be suspended if the report is not submitted.

== Legislative history ==
On September 29, 2026, the resolution was defeated 51 to 47 in a Senate floor vote. Democrat John Fetterman joined Republicans in voting against the resolution, and Republican Rand Paul voted in favor.

Following the vote, Van Hollen said, "It is our responsibility to ensure recipients of US taxpayer dollars act in line with our laws and our values – this resolution was an opportunity to shed light on a reality that flies in the face of that principle."

== Reception ==
The resolution was supported by groups including the Friends Committee on National Legislation, Amnesty International, the Arab American Institute, and the Council on American—Islamic Relations.
