= Detention of Mohammed Zaher Ibrahim =

Palestinian and American detainee (born 2009)

Mohammed Zaher Ibrahim
- محمد زاهر إبراهيم
- Born: March 13, 2009 (age 17)
- Citizenship: Palestine; United States
- Relatives: Sayfollah Musallet (cousin)

Mohammed Zaher Ibrahim (born March 2009) is a Palestinian and American teenager who was detained by the Israeli military from February to November 2025 on allegations of throwing stones at Israeli vehicles. His case drew widespread attention from U.S. lawmakers and over 100 human rights, civil rights, and faith-based organizations, which urged the United States government to intervene on his behalf. Ibrahim, who was held without trial and denied family visitation during his detention, was released in late November 2025.

== Background ==
Ibrahim is Palestinian American, born in Florida. His family lives in both Palm Bay, Florida and the West Bank village of al-Mazraa ash-Sharqiya. He is the youngest of five children. His cousin, Sayfollah Musallet, was beaten to death by Israeli settlers in July 2025 while visiting relatives in the village of Sinjil. According to other relatives, Ibrahim was not informed of his cousin's death as of October 2025.

Since the outbreak of the Gaza war on October 7, 2023, Israel has carried out mass arrests and detentions of Palestinians. Thousands have been arrested in the Israeli-occupied Palestinian territories and in Israel, based on alleged militant activity, offensive social media postings, or arbitrarily. Following the October 7 attacks, official Palestinian statistics indicated that over 9,000 Palestinian children had been apprehended by Israel in the West Bank.

News outlets and human rights organizations both within and outside of Israel reported that thousands of Gazan workers in Israel were detained in the weeks following October 7. Additionally, Israel has detained or subjected to enforced disappearance residents of the Gaza Strip, arrested Palestinians in the West Bank and Arab citizens of Israel, and detained fighters captured inside Israel. Concerns have been raised regarding the legality, secrecy, and conditions of many detentions, including allegations of widespread mistreatment, torture, and sexual assault.

== Arrest and detention ==
According to his family, Ibrahim was arrested on February 16, 2025, at the age of 15 from their family home in al-Mazraa ash-Sharqiya, a Palestinian village north of Ramallah. His relatives state that an interrogation video obtained from the Israeli military shows Ibrahim denying allegations of throwing rocks at Israeli vehicles. After he was released Ibrahim's lawyer stated that he only confessed to stone throwing after being beaten by IDF soldiers using the butts of their rifles and was threatened with continued beatings if he did not confess. Advocacy organizations state that Ibrahim was first held in Megiddo prison and subsequently transferred to Ofer Prison.

As of October 24, 2025, Ibrahim was "believed to be the only U.S. child currently held in Israeli detention". Israeli lawyer Leah Tsemel commented on the accounts of malnutrition and disease, telling NPR: "Even a boy — even a younger boy than this one — is considered a security prisoner, and will be limited and denied of any right, including food, including family visits." As a U.S. citizen, Ibrahim was denied visitation from his parents throughout his eight-month incarceration. If found guilty, he faced a maximum sentence of 20 years in prison.

== Campaign for release ==
In March 2025, Ibrahim's father contacted Florida Republican congressman Mike Haridopolos after not hearing from his son for 45 days following his arrest. Haridopolos's office confirmed they received the queries and forwarded his information to the U.S. State Department. Embassy officials eventually visited Ibrahim and informed his family that he appeared "to have lost 12 kilograms (26 lb) in the spring".

On August 26, 2025, a coalition of over 100 American "faith, human rights, and civil rights groups" sent a letter to U.S. Secretary of State Marco Rubio demanding Ibrahim's safe release. Notable signatories included the Council on American–Islamic Relations, IfNotNow, Jewish Voice for Peace, Sunrise Movement, Pax Christi, and the family of Ayşenur Ezgi Eygi. The American-Arab Anti-Discrimination Committee, also a coalition member, purchased a billboard in Times Square reading "Free Mohammed Ibrahim" and "Israel has held him without trial ever since" the start of his detention. The same day, Tampa Bay congresswoman Kathy Castor shared a statement urging the Trump Administration to secure Ibrahim's release.

On September 8, 2025, Minnesota congresswoman Ilhan Omar posted on X (formerly Twitter): "The Israeli government is holding Mohammed Zaher Ibrahim, a 16-year-old Palestinian-American citizen, in prison. He has been held without trial for over six months. He must be released." The U.S. State Department announced on September 28, 2025, that it was appointing a dedicated official to work on Ibrahim's case. This followed a series of high-profile meetings on Capitol Hill, as well as a press conference with members of Ibrahim's family alongside Washington congresswoman Pramila Jayapal and representatives from the families of American citizens killed by the Israeli military or Israeli settlers: Ayşenur Ezgi Eygi, Sayfollah Musallet, Tawfiq Abdel Jabbar, and Rachel Corrie. Eygi's sister Ozden Bennett met with Massachusetts representative Jim McGovern, telling the lawmaker that Ibrahim "feels like my little brother", adding: "I can't do anything for my sister, but we can help him."

According to his uncle, Ibrahim was not included in the exchange of hostages and prisoners from the 2025 Gaza peace plan and remained in Israeli prison as of October 16, 2025. On October 22, 2025, 27 Democratic members of Congress wrote to Marco Rubio and U.S. ambassador to Israel Mike Huckabee urging them to "secure the swift release of this American boy". In response to mounting pressure from U.S. senators to release Ibrahim, the Israeli embassy in Washington sent them a letter defending his prolonged detention.

== U.S. government response and diplomatic friction ==
During Ibrahim's detention, his case became a point of diplomatic tension between the United States and Israel. The U.S. Department of State repeatedly stated that it was monitoring the situation with concern, emphasizing Israel's obligations toward American citizens held abroad. U.S. consular officers visited Ibrahim while he was in custody and informed his family of his significant weight loss and a skin condition (scabies), noting that his medical status was being monitored. Reports indicated that Israeli authorities limited access and delayed responses to U.S. consular inquiries, contributing to rising diplomatic tensions. A State Department spokesperson told Al Jazeera that consular assistance “may include visiting detained U.S. citizens, ensuring access to necessary medication or medical care, and facilitating authorized communication with their family or others.”

In September 2025, the Department appointed a dedicated official to coordinate its efforts on Ibrahim's case, a move described by the media as an “escalation” of diplomatic engagement with Israel.

The appointment came amid growing congressional and public pressure, as dozens of U.S. lawmakers and more than 100 civil rights, human rights, and faith-based organizations urged the U.S. government to secure his release. After Ibrahim's release in November 2025, U.S. officials sought additional information from Israeli authorities regarding the conditions of his detention, including allegations of mistreatment, weight loss, and lack of parental contact. The case remained under internal review within the State Department, indicating ongoing concern rather than resolution of the diplomatic tension.

== Release ==
On November 27, 2025, Ibrahim was released from prison after over nine months in detention. After being released from Israeli prison Ibrahim was checked into a hospital, and his family stated that while in detention, Ibrahim lost over 25 pounds (11 kg) and developed scabies. According to relatives, Ibrahim witnessed the death of a fellow inmate, 17-year-old Walid Khalid Abdullah Ahmad, in Israeli custody from scabies and a stomach virus in late March.

In September 2026, Ibrahim and his uncle Ziad spoke to the UNGA for the "Childhood in Custody" high-level dialogue, hosted by Save the Children.
