= Killing of Tawfic Abdel Jabbar =

2024 killing in West Bank, Palestine

- Location: Highway 60, West Bank, Palestine
- Date: 19 January 2024
- Attack type: Homicide by shooting
- Deaths: 1
- Perpetrators: Israeli settlers, Israel Police, Israel Defense Forces

On 19 January 2024, Palestinian-American teenager Tawfic Abdel Jabbar (Note: Different sources list his surname as either Abdel Jabbar or Ajaq.) (Arabic: توفيق عبد الجبار) was driving on Highway 60 in the West Bank when he was shot and killed. An Israeli police statement stated that an off-duty Israeli police officer, an Israel Defense Forces soldier, and an Israeli settler had opened fire on Abdel Jabbar's vehicle. Abdel Jabbar was the 94th child, 358th Palestinian, and first American killed in the West Bank since the start of the Gaza war.

== Background ==
Tawfic Abdel Jabbar was born and raised in Gretna, Louisiana, United States. His family frequently traveled to their ancestral home in Al-Mazra'a ash-Sharqiya, West Bank, Palestine. The Abdel Jabbar family had lived there for over 200 years and both of his parents had grown up in the village. Two of Abdel Jabbar's great-uncles were killed by Israeli settlers.

Abdel Jabbar traveled to Al-Mazra'a ash-Sharqiya with his family in May 2023 to connect with relatives and learn about Palestinian culture. He was in his senior year of high school and was studying remotely at the time of his death.

== Killing ==
On the afternoon of 19 January 2024, Abdel Jabbar was driving on Highway 60 around Al-Mazra'a ash-Sharqiya with his friends to attend a picnic. At around 2:20 P.M., an Israeli settler fired multiple shots with a rifle at the back of Abdel Jabbar's vehicle. As Abdel Jabbar attempted to drive away from the shots, an Israeli military vehicle then began shooting from the opposite direction. At least 10 shots were fired at Abdel Jabbar. After being shot in the head, Abdel Jabbar lost control of the vehicle, leading to it flipping over multiple times.

Abdel Jabbar's father reported arriving at the scene of the shooting finding him with gunshot wounds in his chest and neck. IDF soldiers at the scene when his father arrived pointed guns and warned people to stay away from the area. Joe Abdel Qaki, a relative of Abdel Jabbar, and other witnesses at the scene were briefly detained by Israeli forces. Israeli forces prevented emergency responders from reaching the scene for at least 15 minutes. Israeli soldiers prevented a Palestinian ambulance from passing, forcing it to take a detour to the hospital.

Abdel Jabbar was taken to the Palestine Medical Complex in Ramallah and was pronounced dead by the time he entered the hospital at 4:03 PM. The reported cause of death was a gunshot wound to the right side of the head. He died at the age of 17. Abdel Jabbar was buried in a family cemetery in Al-Mazra'a ash-Sharqiya.

Abdel Jabbar was the 94th child, 358th Palestinian, and first American killed in the West Bank since the start of the Gaza war.

== Aftermath ==
=== Reactions ===
==== United States ====
Following Abdel Jabbar's killing, his family has criticized the United States' support of Israel. His mother said: "My son, he was killed by — I don't want to say American bullets, but at least by American money. We live there, we work there. Our business is there, we pay in taxes there. So my taxes are going to the bullet that killed my son." During Abdel Jabbar's funeral in Al-Mazra'a ash-Sharqiya, his father said: "The American society does not know the true story. Come here on the ground and see what's going on. How many fathers and mothers have to say goodbye to their children? How many more?" Abdel Jabbar's uncle stated: "We feel abandoned by our government." Following the shooting, officials from the US Embassy met with Abdel Jabbar's family told them that an Israeli-led investigation would take place. Officials also collected eyewitness accounts.

United States National Security Council spokesperson John Kirby called Abdel Jabbar's death a "a tragic killing" and called on Israel to "conduct a full, thorough and transparent investigation into his killing." United States State Department spokesperson Vedant Patel called for an "urgent investigation to determine the circumstance of his death." George Noll, Chief of the U.S. Office of Palestinian Affairs, visited Abdel Jabbar's family to express condolences. In response a rise in violence against Palestinians by Israeli settlers, including Abdel Jabbar's killing, United States President Joe Biden issued an executive order on February 1, 2024, imposing financial and visa restrictions on four Israeli settlers who committed acts of violence against Palestinians. The executive order was repealed by Donald Trump in January 2025.

Michigan representative Rashida Tlaib called for an investigation into the killing, stating: "Tawfiq deserved to grow old." Maryland senator Chris Van Hollen met with Abdel Jabbar's family and called for accountability for the killing.

A vigil at the Masjid Omar mosque in Harvey and a memorial drive in the New Orleans area were held. A mural in Gretna, Louisiana dedicated to Abdel Jabbar and "all of the victims of the 76-year genocide of Palestinians" was painted in August 2024.

==== Israel ====
The initial Israeli police statement stated that an off-duty Israeli police officer, an Israel Defense Forces soldier, and an Israeli settler had opened fire on Abdel Jabbar's vehicle. The police statement and an IDF report also stated that Abdel Jabbar had been involved in throwing rocks along Highway 60, without evidence. Mohammed Salameh, who was in the passenger seat when Abdel Jabbar was killed, and Abdel Jabbar's father disputed the claim. A B'Tselem investigation stated that the shooting was not in response to stone throwing. The original police report did not mention that Abdel Jabbar was shot while driving.

Israeli police stated that it was conducting an investigation into Abdel Jabbar's killing. As of October 2024, Israeli authorities had not collected any eyewitness accounts. As of July 2025, no findings have been publicly released and no suspects have been charged.

Israeli authorities placed a travel ban on Abdel Jabbar's family, preventing them from leaving the West Bank, which was lifted seven months later after intervention by the US Embassy.

=== Further killings ===
On February 10, 2024, another killing occurred under similar circumstances; 17 year old Palestinian-American Mohammad Khdour was shot in the head and killed by Israeli forces while driving in the West Bank, outside Biddu. In response to the killings of Khdour and Abdel Jabbar, United States secretary of state Antony Blinken offered his "deepest condolences" to the families. United States national security advisor Jake Sullivan said that investigations into both killings were pending.

In October 2024, attorneys at the US Department of Justice filed an internal letter to attorney general Merrick Garland calling for investigations into potential violations of US law by Israel's government, military, and citizenry. The letter highlighted the killing of Americans by Israelis, including Abdel Jabbar, Ayşenur Eygi, Kamel Ahmad Jawad, Khdour, Jacob Flickinger, Omar Assad, and Shireen Abu Akleh, illegal settlements in the West Bank, and war crimes in the Gaza war as potential violations of US law.

On 11 July 2025, Palestinian American Sayfollah Musallet was beaten to death by Israeli settlers in Sinjil, West Bank. Abdel Jabbar's father witnessed the killing and was also almost attacked, stating: "If it would've taken us five more seconds, we all would've been beaten." 29 senators, led by Maryland senator Chris Van Hollen, sent a letter to secretary of state Marco Rubio and attorney general Pam Bondi calling for an independent investigation in the killing of Musallet and an update on the investigation into Abdel Jabbar's killing.

In September 2025, families of Americans killed by Israeli forces and settlers, including the families of Abdel Jabbar, Musallet, Eygi, and Rachel Corrie, held a conference outside the US Capitol alongside lawmakers, led by Washington representative Pramila Jayapal, calling for independent investigations and accountability.

Massachusetts representative Ayanna Pressley called for an investigation into the killings of Abdel Jabbar and Sayfollah Musallet in October 2025. In February 2026, following the killing of Palestinian-American teenager Nasrallah Abu Siyam, CAIR filed a letter calling for secretary of state Marco Rubio and attorney general Pam Bondi to investigate the killing of Abu Siyam, Abdel Jabbar, and other Americans killed by Israelis. In September 2026, Maryland senator Chris Van Hollen introduced Senate Resolution 852, which would require the US State Department to report on Israel's human rights practices and violence in the West Bank, citing the killings of Abdel Jabbar and eight other Americans in the West Bank. The resolution failed to pass by a vote of 47 to 51.

As of September 2026, there have been no criminals charges in the killings of Americans by Israelis since January 2022.

== See also ==
- Israeli settler violence
