= Demographics of Los Angeles =

- Population pyramid of Los Angeles city in 2021
- Population: 3,979,576 (2019)

Language
- Official: English
- Spoken: Spanish

The demographics of Los Angeles are determined by population surveys, such as the American Community Survey and the United States census. According to 2019 U.S. Census Bureau estimates, the City of Los Angeles' population was 3,979,576.

== Race, ethnicity, and national origin ==
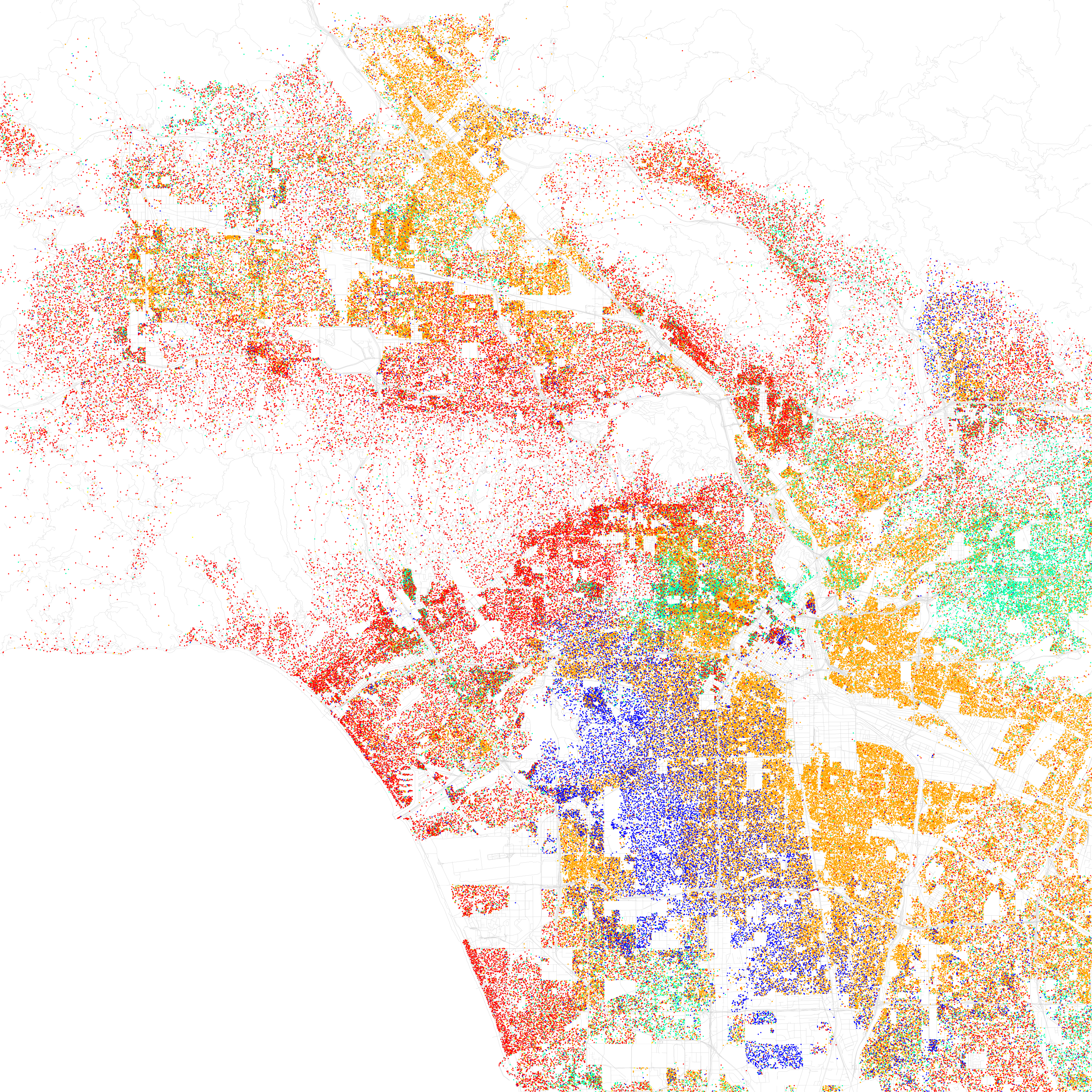
Map of racial distribution in Los Angeles, 2010 U.S. Census. Each dot is 25 people: White, Black, Asian, Hispanic, or Other (yellow)

Los Angeles city, California – Racial and ethnic composition Note: the US Census treats Hispanic/Latino as an ethnic category. This table excludes Latinos from the racial categories and assigns them to a separate category. Hispanics/Latinos may be of any race.
Race / Ethnicity (NH = Non-Hispanic)	Pop 1980	Pop 1990	Pop 2000	Pop 2010	Pop 2020	% 1980	% 1990	% 2000	% 2010	% 2020
White alone (NH)	1,433,330	1,299,604	1,099,188	1,086,908	1,126,052	48.31%	37.29%	29.75%	28.66%	28.88%
Black or African American alone (NH)	495,292	454,289	401,986	347,380	322,553	16.69%	13.03%	10.88%	9.16%	8.27%
Native American or Alaska Native alone (NH)	14,731	9,774	8,897	6,589	6,614	0.50%	0.28%	0.24%	0.17%	0.17%
Asian alone (NH)	198,436	320,668	364,850	420,212	454,585	6.69%	9.20%	9.87%	11.08%	11.66%
Native Hawaiian or Pacific Islander alone (NH)	N/A	N/A	4,484	4,300	4,573	N/A	N/A	0.12%	0.11%	0.12%
Other race alone (NH)	9,756	9,652	9,065	12,057	26,351	0.33%	0.28%	0.25%	0.32%	0.68%
Mixed race or Multiracial (NH)	N/A	N/A	87,277	76,353	128,028	N/A	N/A	2.36%	2.01%	3.28%
Hispanic or Latino (any race)	815,305	1,391,441	1,719,073	1,838,822	1,829,991	27.48%	39.92%	46.53%	48.48%	46.94%
Total	2,966,850	3,485,428	3,694,820	3,792,621	3,898,747	100.00%	100.00%	100.00%	100.00%	100.00%

The 1990 United States census and 2000 United States census found that non-Hispanic whites were becoming a minority in Los Angeles; estimates for the 2010 United States census results found Latinos to be approximately half (47–49%) of the city's population, growing from 40% in 2000 and 30–35% in 1990, respectively.

The racial, ethnic and cultural composition of Los Angeles, as of 2020, according to DEC redistricting data, was as follows:

- Hispanic or Latino (of any race): 46.9%
- White (alone, not Hispanic or Latino): 28.9%
- Asian (alone): 11.7%
- Black or African American (alone): 8.3%
- Two or more races: 3.3%
- Other (alone): 0.7%
- Native American (alone): 0.2%
- Native Hawaiian and Other Pacific Islander (alone): 0.1%

Approximately 59.4% of Los Angeles' residents were born in the United States; 0.9% were born in Puerto Rico, Guam or other U.S. territories, or born abroad to American parents. Around 39.7% of the population was foreign-born, with the majority (64.5%) being born in Latin America. A large minority (26.3%) were born in Asia. Smaller numbers were born in Europe (6.5%), Africa (1.5%), Northern America (0.9%), and Oceania (0.3%).

== Languages ==
According to the 2021 American Community Survey, the most commonly spoken languages in Los Angeles by people aged 5 years and over (3,650,704 people) were:

- Language other than English: 56.8%
- Speak only English: 43.2%
- Spanish: 36%
- Asian languages and Pacific Islander languages: 7.9%
- Other Indo-European languages: 7.4%
- Other languages: 1.4%

The top non-English languages spoken at home in Los Angeles are Spanish, Korean, Armenian, Chinese and Persian.

== Households and educational attainment ==
According to the 2006-2008 American Community Survey, the types of households were as follows out of 1,275,534 total:

- Family households: 61.1% (778,991)
- With own children under 18 years: 30.9% (394,253)
- Married-couple family: 39.1% (498,998)
- With own children under 18 years: 19.6% (250,054)
- Male head-of-household family; no wife present: 6.9% (88,600)
- With own children under 18 years: 3.0% (38,239)
- Female head-of-household family; no husband present: 15.0% (191,393)
- With own children under 18 years: 8.3% (105,960)
- Non-family households: 38.9% (496,543)
- Householder living alone: 30.2% (385,843)
- 65 years and over: 8.0% (102,016)
- Households with one or more people under 18 years: 34.6% (441,723)
- Households with one or more people 65 years and over: 21.1% (268,624)
- Average household size: 2.87
- Average family size: 3.67

According to the same survey, the educational status of residents over 25 years (2,407,775 total) was as follows:

- Less than 9th grade: 15.9% (383,385)
- 9th to 12th grade, no diploma: 11.1% (267,833)
- High school graduate: 21.1% (509,021)
- Some college, no degree: 16.7% (402,973)
- Associate degree: 5.9% (141,764)
- Bachelor's degree: 19.2% (462,701)
- Graduate or professional degree: 10.0% (240,098)
- Percent high school graduate or higher: 72.9%
- Percent bachelor's degree or higher: 29.2%

== Income and poverty ==
According to the 2006-2008 American Community Survey, the income status of residents was as follows:

- Median household income: $48,610
- Mean household income: $76,557
- Median family income: $53,008
- Mean family income: $83,965
- Median non-family income: $38,227
- Mean non-family income: $61,155

According to the same survey, the poverty status of residents was as follows:

- All families: 15.6%
- Married-couple families: 10.2%
- Families with female householder, no husband present: 30.1%
- All people: 18.9%
- Under 18 years: 27.8%
- 18 years and over: 16.0%
- 18 to 64 years: 16.5%
- 65 years and over: 12.9%

== Employment ==
According to the 2006-2008 American Community Survey, the employment status of residents was as follows

- Population 16 years and over: 2,923,315
- In labor force: 65.8% (1,924,833)
- Civilian labor force: 65.8% (1,923,236)
- Employed: 61.3% (1,792,596)
- Unemployed: 4.5% (130,640)
- Armed Forces: 0.1% (1,597)
- Not in labor force: 34.2% (998,482)

== Religious and Ethnic Demographics ==
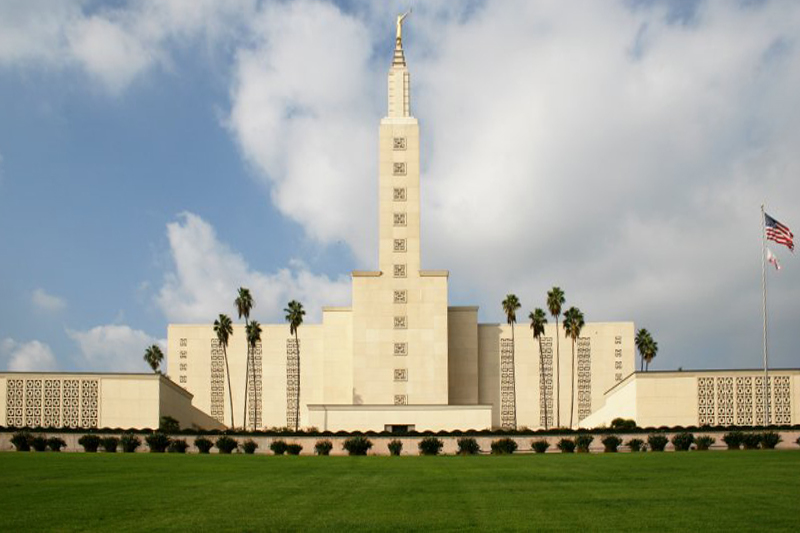
Los Angeles California Temple

Religion in Los Angeles (2020 PRRI)
1. Protestantism (35.0%)
2. Roman Catholicism (31.0%)
3. Mormon (1.00%)
4. No religion (28.0%)
5. Judaism (2.00%)
6. Islam (1.00%)
7. Buddhism (1.00%)
8. Hinduism (1.00%)

According to a 2014 study by the Pew Research Center, Christianity is the most practiced religion in Los Angeles, with around 65% of residents adhering to the faith; around 32% of these followed the Roman Catholic Church, 30% to various Protestant denominations, and the last 3% adhering to other Christian persuasions (including Orthodox Christians, Jehovah's Witnesses and Mormons). An estimated 25% of the population was not affiliated with any religion (with 4% self-identifying as atheistic and another 4% self-identifying as agnostic), while 9% adhered to other Abrahamic or non-Christian faiths (primarily Buddhism, Hinduism, Islam and Judaism); a remaining 1% answered "don't know".

Los Angeles has the highest Druze populace, living anywhere in the world, outside of Lebanon or Syria.

Los Angeles has the world's largest population of Saudi Arabian expatriates (est. 20,000), according to the Saudi Embassy of the USA.

About 15,000 Louisiana Creole people of Acadian and Cajun background from Louisiana and the U.S. Gulf Coast, are present in Los Angeles. Many live in the South Central area.

In the 1980 and 1990 Census, Bosnians had established themselves in fairly large numbers in Los Angeles, before the breakup of the former Yugoslavia and Bosnian War of the 1990s. However, Yugoslav immigration was already ongoing in Los Angeles and beyond, in Southern California (i.e. San Pedro, Los Angeles), since the turn of the 20th century's global immigration boom.

Salvadoran Americans are the second largest Hispanic and Latino population in Los Angeles, which is the largest Salvadoran population outside of El Salvador and the Salvadoran diaspora living abroad and overseas. Most were refugees whom arrived in the 1980s and 1990s during the Salvadoran Civil War, part of the Central American Crisis.

Los Angeles hosts the largest population of Belizeans outside of Belize, with approximately 55,000 Belizeans residing in the Greater Los Angeles area. They are primarily concentrated in South Central, Inglewood, and Compton. The Belizean community, consisting largely of Belizean Kriols along with smaller numbers of Garifuna and Mestizos, is one of the largest groups of Black Central American, Caribbean, and Black immigrants in Los Angeles County.

Armenians made an ethnic presence in Glendale, Silver Lake/Elysian Park and Los Feliz/Hollywood.

Los Angeles has a sizable Boricua community (50,000 out of 145,000 in California), with just as many in San Diego, the largest populace of Puerto Ricans living west of the Mississippi River, including the island of Puerto Rico itself.

Once a tradition, the descendants of original Anglo-American settlers who represented civic leaders and economic influence in the city of Los Angeles held Iowa picnics in MacArthur Park, though this has not been observed since the early 1970s.

Cherokee Indians, among other Native American tribes (such as the Apache, Choctaw, Comanche, Hopi, Muscogee (Creek), Navajo, Nez Perce, Northern Paiute, Shawnee and Zuni peoples), account for Los Angeles likely having the largest Urban Indian population.

Los Angeles, along with Pasadena at the turn of the 20th century, were one of two of the earliest internationally-known retirement communities to attract a significant number of senior citizens and retirees in search of a warmer climate to relax in, and to better overall health and wellness.

L.A. hosts the fourth largest number of Muslims in the United States. When the estimated 500,000 Muslims living in the greater Los Angeles area are included, Los Angeles hosts the second largest number of Muslims among U.S. cities.

There are around 50,000 Roma living in the Los Angeles area, making it one of the cities with the highest Roma concentration in the U.S.

More than 1.2 million Los Angeles residents are of Mexican ancestry. Mexican influences can be seen in the city’s culture. Mexican Americans are the largest ethnic group in Los Angeles.

Greeks began immigrating to Los Angeles in the 1890s. There was a small population of Greeks living in the Boyle Heights area, along with other immigrant groups including Russians, Syrians, Armenians, and East European Jews by the late 1890s.

There is a significant Italian American community in Los Angeles.

Approximately 600,000 Filipino Americans live in the Greater Los Angeles area, roughly half of the total California population.

Los Angeles has the largest Thai population outside of Thailand.

== Place of birth ==
The majority of immigrants to Los Angeles were born in Mexico, followed by El Salvador and Guatemala.

== LGBTQ population ==
Main Article: LGBTQ culture in Los Angeles County

Los Angeles has a large LGBTQ population, notably in neighboring West Hollywood outside the city limits of Los Angeles.

== See also ==
- List of notable people from Los Angeles
- Greater Los Angeles
- History of African Americans in Los Angeles
- History of the Jews in Los Angeles
- History of Mexican Americans in Los Angeles
- History of Armenian Americans in Los Angeles
- History of Chinese Americans in Los Angeles
- History of Iranian Americans in Los Angeles
- History of the Japanese in Los Angeles
- History of Korean Americans in Greater Los Angeles
- History of Palestinians in Los Angeles
- Ukrainian Americans in Los Angeles
