= Jiljilia =

Jiljilia may refer to:

- Jaljulia, an Arab Israeli town
- Jiljilyya, a Palestinian town in the Ramallah and al-Bireh Governorate in the northern West Bank
