= Givat Harel =

Israeli settlement in the West Bank

Coordinates: 32°3′32″N 35°16′24″E

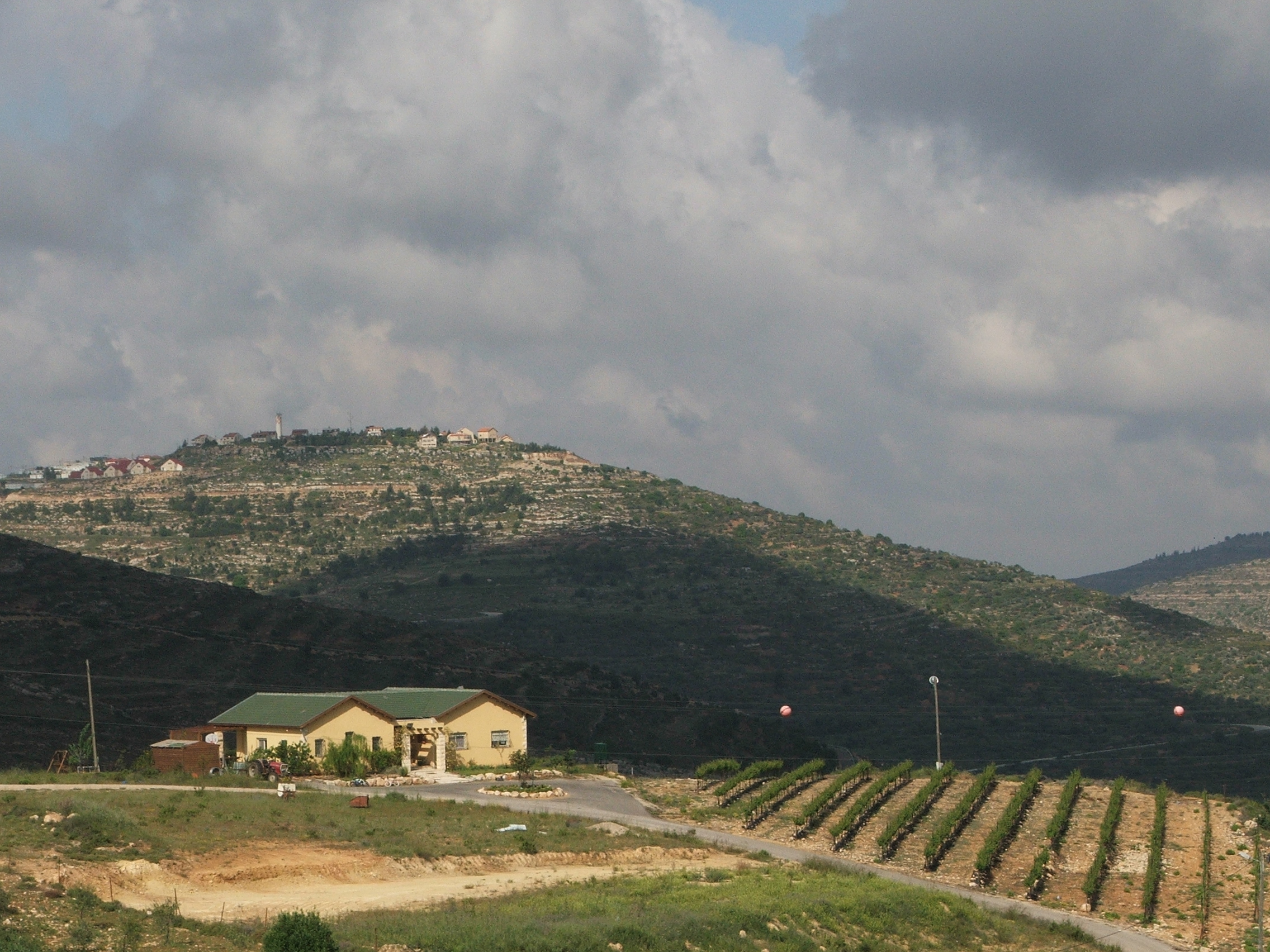
Home in Givat Harel overlooking vineyard

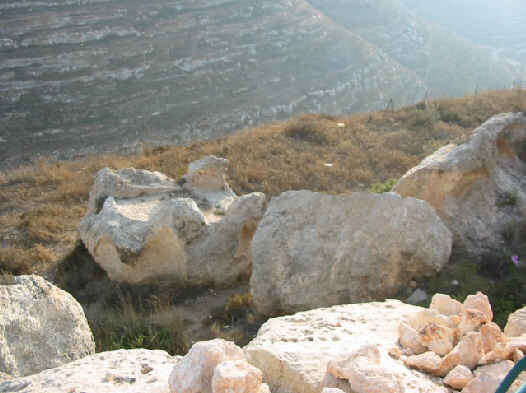
Israelite horned altar in Givat Harel

Givat Harel (Hebrew: גבעת הראל) is an Israeli settlement in the West Bank, built as an illegal outpost in 1998 and legalized in 2023 by the Israeli government. The settlement was illegally established in 1998 mostly on Palestinian private lands.

It falls under the jurisdiction of the Mateh Binyamin Regional Council in the northern West Bank, north of Nahal Shilo. Givat Harel is situated just off Highway 60 (Israel-Palestine), next to the Palestinian village of Sinjil.

In February 2023 the Israeli government approved the legalization of Givat Harel, and 8 other settlements and does not consider them illegal settlements. As part of the legalization Givat Harel and another outpost, Givat HaRoeh, were unified into a new settlement called "Giv'ot HaRoeh".

The international community considers Israeli settlements in the West Bank illegal under international law, but the Israeli government disputes this.

== Name ==
Givat Harel means Harel's Heights or Hill in Hebrew. The outpost was named after Harel bin Nun, son of Rabbi Elhanan bin Nun, former rabbi of the nearby Shiloh settlement, who was killed along with Shlomo Liebman on August 4, 1998. After the funeral it was decided to establish an agricultural settlement in Harel's memory.

== History ==
According to ARIJ, land was "forcefully seized by Israeli settlers" from the Palestinian village of Sinjil in order to construct Givat Harel.

The road to Givat Harel was paved by the Netanyahu government when Ariel Sharon served as minister of national infrastructures.

In July 2012, the IDF fired into the air to disperse settlers from Givat Harel and Palestinians from the neighboring town of Sinjil. A clash erupted when settlers met for prayers at the entrance to the town. The settlers say that Sinjil villagers are farming state land in an attempt to take control of it, while the authorities maintain that the property belongs to Sinjil.
