= Killing of Mohammad Khdour =

2024 killing in West Bank, Palestine

- Location: Biddu, West Bank, Palestine
- Date: February 10, 2024
- Attack type: Homicide by shooting
- Deaths: 1
- Perpetrator: One or more persons from an Israeli vehicle

On February 10, 2024, 17-year-old Palestinian-American Mohammad Ahmed Mohammad Khdour (Arabic: محمد أحمد محمد خضور) was shot and killed by an Israeli gunman while driving with his cousin outside Biddu in the West Bank. According to the human rights organization Defence for Children International – Palestine (DCIP), the killing was perpetrated by Israeli forces. Khdour's killing came a month after the killing of another 17-year-old Palestinian-American named Tawfic Abdel Jabbar, making him the second American citizen killed in the West Bank since the beginning of the Gaza war.

== Khdour's early life ==
Khdour, a United States citizen, was born in Hollywood, Florida, on October 12, 2006. He had resided in Biddu in the West Bank since the age of 2.

== Killing ==
On February 10, 2024, Khdour was driving his brother's Chevrolet with his cousin on the hillsides of Biddu. Before the shooting, the two boys took photos of each other for social media and ate chocolate-covered waffles. While returning to the village, the two heard gunfire before Khdour was shot once in the head by a bullet through the car window. Khdour's cousin ran out of the vehicle to escape. According to Khdour's brother Hamed, the cousin said the shots had come from a white Mitsubishi with an Israeli license plate and that the car was on the other side of the security fence separating Israeli Territory from Biddu.

Videos showed a group of men pulling Khdour's limp body out of his car through the shattered glass. He died hours later at 11 PM in a hospital in Ramallah and was buried in Biddu.

== Reactions ==
Upon news of Khdour's killing, US Secretary of State Antony Blinken offered his "deepest condolences" to the families of both Khdour and Tawfic Abdel Jabbar, and called for an investigation to be launched into their deaths, stating "We’ve made clear that with regard to the incidents you’ve alluded to, there needs to be an investigation. We need to get the facts. And if appropriate, there needs to be accountability..." The State Department's Office of Palestinian Affairs denounced the killing on X, writing "We are devastated by the killing of 17-year-old US citizen Mohammad Ahmad Khdour..." and that "The United States has no greater priority than the safety and security of US citizens. We urgently call for a quick, thorough, and transparent investigation, including full accountability."

The Council on American-Islamic Relations denounced Khdour's killing as "murder" and called on President Joe Biden to denounce his death, as well as an overnight strike that killed 100 people in Rafah the same day. CAIR's National Executive Director Nihad Awad criticized the administration in a statement, writing that "The Biden administration has repeatedly failed to hold the far-right Israeli government accountable for attacks like last night’s Rafah massacre and even attacks on American citizens, like the assassination of journalist Shireen Abu Akleh and the murder of another American teenager, Tawfiq [Abdel Jabbar], last month. These failures embolden the Israeli government to kill more innocent people with impunity." The statement also called for Biden to protect Americans in other nations and that "he must stop enabling genocidal war crimes against Palestinians in Gaza."

The human rights organization Defence for Children International – Palestine (DCIP) claimed that the killing had been perpetrated by Israeli forces.

The Israeli Defense Forces referred questions about the shooting to the Shin Bet, who gave no comment to news outlets.

== Aftermath and investigation ==
Several days after Khdour's death, his family said that US embassy staff visited their home to investigate the killing. According to rights organizations, the Israeli justice system rarely prosecutes people for killing Palestinians. In September 2024, the US embassy told the Khdour family that the Israeli investigation into Khdour's death was making progress, but no suspect has been arrested yet.

On April 4, 2024, Israeli forces raided the Khdour family home and detained his brother, Omar, and two of his cousins. Omar was blindfolded and handcuffed and detained from 4 a.m. to 3 p.m. During questioning, interrogators threatened him and attempted to get him to blame Khdour's killing on his friend, Mansour. Following the killing, Israeli forces at checkpoints have prevented Omar from leaving the West Bank.

Khdour's death has been cited in discussions and news articles about the killings of Americans by Israelis, including the killing of Ayşenur Eygi in the West Bank in September 2024. After Eygi's death, The Washington Post interviewed Khdour's father who referred to "an ongoing killing machine in the West Bank."

The US government has been criticized for not holding Israel accountable for the killings of US citizens, including Khdour. After Eygi's death, Sen. Patty Murray and Rep. Pramila Jayapal wrote a letter to Secretary of State Antony Blinken demanding an investigation and stating that Khdour and other Americans have been killed by Israel without accountability. At a September 2024 confirmation hearing for Stephanie Hallet, she was questioned by Senator Chris Van Hollen about the killings of Khdour and others. She described Israel's response as "unsatisfactory" but said that the US government is holding Israel accountable. Van Hollen stated that he did not believe the US State Department to be "actively pursuing" the incidents and that it "has not taken sufficient action to hold individuals accountable for the killings of American citizens."

The following month, three US Department of Justice (DOJ) attorneys wrote a letter to Merrick Garland accusing the DOJ of neglecting to enforce US law against Israelis for killing American citizens. The letter noted that the DOJ has brought charges against Hamas and Russia for killing US citizens and cited seven American citizens killed by Israel, including Khdour, for whom the DOJ has not brought any charges.
