= Killing of Sayfollah Musallet =

2025 killing of an American by Israeli settlers

- Location: Sinjil, West Bank, Palestine
- Date: 11 July 2025
- Attack type: Beating
- Perpetrators: Israeli settlers

On 11 July 2025, Sayfollah Musallet, an American citizen visiting his family in the village of Sinjil, Palestine, was beaten to death by Israeli settlers during a confrontation between a group of Israelis and Palestinians. He was the fifth American citizen to be killed in the West Bank since the beginning of the Gaza war.

== Background ==
Sayfollah "Saif" Musallet was a 20-year-old Palestinian American who was born in Port Charlotte, Florida. He lived in Tampa, where he worked at his family's ice cream and dessert shop. Musallet traveled to al-Mazra'a ash-Sharqiya on 4 June 2025 to visit his family shortly before his 21st birthday.

According to the United Nations, nearly 1,000 Palestinians have been killed by Israeli settler violence or the Israel Defense Forces since the start of the Gaza war in October 2023. Palestinian residents of Sinjil, where Musallet's family owned farmland, reported increased encroachments on their land by Israeli settlers in the two months prior to the killing. Musallet's cousin, Mohammed Ibrahim, was arrested in February 2025 and held in pre-trial detention at Megiddo prison for over five months at the time of Musallet's killing.

== Killing ==
On 11 July, Musallet and dozens of other Palestinians travelled to the neighbouring town of Sinjil after Friday prayers to try and reach land that their families owned. One goal of this group was to protest a new illegal outpost created by Israeli settlers next to the town. Accounts differ, with Palestinian accounts blaming the settlers for initiating violence, while the Israel Defense Forces (IDF) said that physical clashes and vandalism of Palestinian property broke out after two Israelis were lightly injured by thrown rocks. Multiple eyewitnesses told CNN that Israeli settlers attacked the Palestinians and Musallet was beaten by a group with clubs. According to Musallet's brother, he was unconscious but breathing and in need of medical attention.

Settlers in the area smashed an ambulance windshield and prevented ambulances from reaching Musallet for at least two hours. According to the IDF, soldiers and police were dispatched to disperse the crowds after receiving reports of violence. Security forces fired tear gas to disperse the Palestinians and also reportedly did not allow ambulances to pass.

According to another US citizen among the group of Palestinians, ambulances were only allowed to pass after a vehicle from the Coordinator of Government Activities in the Territories arrived. Musallet had stopped breathing by the time he was reached by an ambulance and he died before reaching the hospital. According to the Palestinian Health Ministry, Mohammed Rizq Hussein al-Shalabi, a 23-year-old Palestinian, also died after being shot during the attack and was allowed to bleed out for hours.

== Aftermath ==
After the killing, a group of Israeli settlers followed a CNN vehicle, evaded the Israel Border Police, and smashed the rear window with a club as the van escaped. The funeral of Musallet and his friend Mohammed al-Shalabi, who died via a gunshot wound to the chest, took place on 13 July in al-Mazra'a ash-Sharqiya. Hundred of mourners attended and the bodies were wrapped in the Palestinian flag.

== Criminal investigation and proceedings ==
The Israeli military said that it was investigating Musallet's killing, but declined to comment on its role in delaying ambulances. Israeli police stated that it was investigating the attack on the CNN journalists. According to Israeli police, a Palestinian from Sinjil was arrested on the day of the killing and remained in custody while two left-wing activists who were arrested were released and banned from reentering the West Bank for 15-days. On 12 July, six arrests were made in connection with the killing, which included two settlers and an IDF reservist. According to the IDF, the reservist, who Israeli police stated had fired into the air during the clashes, was released after questioning.

== Response ==
Musallet's family blamed both the settlers and the Israeli military for the death and called for the US State Department to investigate the killing; its spokesperson "referred questions about any investigation into the incident to Israel's government," according to CBS News. On 15 July, Mike Huckabee, the US Ambassador to Israel, called the killing a "criminal and terrorist act" and called on the Israeli government to "aggressively" investigate.

== See also ==
- Israeli settler violence
- Zionist political violence
