= Furkan Doğan =

American activist (1991–2010)

- Born: 20 October 1991; Troy, New York, U.S.
- Died: 31 May 2010 (aged 18) near Ashdod, Israel
- Cause of death: Israeli gunfire
- Occupation: Activist
- Known for: İHH activity
- Parent: Ahmet Doğan
- Website: sehitfurkandogan.com

Furkan Doğan (20 October 1991 – 31 May 2010) was a Turkish American who was residing in Turkey permanently. He was shot to death by the Israeli Defense Forces on the MV Mavi Marmara, in the 2010 Gaza flotilla raid. Doğan was the youngest person killed in the raid, and became a political symbol after his death.

== Early life ==
Furkan Doğan was born to ethnic Turkish parents in Troy, New York in the United States and moved to Turkey at the age of two.

He was a high school student at Kayseri Özel Hisarcıklıoğlu Fen Lisesi in Kayseri, Turkey. He wanted to study medicine. He had planned to visit New York in the summer of 2010.

His father, Ahmet Doğan, who graduated from Rensselaer Polytechnic Institute with an MBA in accounting, is an assistant professor of accounting at Erciyes University.

== Gaza flotilla and Doğan's death ==
Dogan was not intensely interested in politics, and his participation in the Gaza Freedom Flotilla, was volunteered by himself. He was killed in the 2010 Gaza flotilla raid. In his final diary entry written on the ship, he wrote about the beauty of martyrdom:

"It is the last hours to martyrdom, insha'Allah. I am wondering if there is a more beautiful thing. The more beautiful thing is only my mother, but I'm not sure. The comparison is very difficult. Martyrdom or my mother? Now, the hall has been evacuated. So far people were not serious, but they have become serious recently."

An autopsy revealed he had suffered five gunshot wounds, to the nose, back, back of the head, left leg, and left ankle, at a distance of 45 centimeters. A UNHCR concluded he was also shot at after he fell wounded on the floor. He was shot when he was filming the events in the ship. The United States alleged that the autopsy report was never handed over to US authorities despite repeated requests to that effect.

== Reactions to his death ==
On 3 June 2010, US Secretary of State Hillary Clinton confirmed his death and said U.S. officials had met with Doğan's father to express their condolences. Clinton said,

"Protecting the welfare of American citizens is a fundamental responsibility of our government and one that we take very seriously. We are in constant contact with the Israeli Government, attempting to obtain more information about our citizens."

U.S. authorities in Turkey have offered U.S. consular services. His funeral service was held at the Fatih Mosque in Istanbul on 3 June 2010.

The American Muslims for Palestine (AMP) condemned the attack. The Christian Science Monitor reported that his US citizenship may make it difficult to avoid a diplomatic confrontation between the US and Israel.

Turkish prime minister Recep Tayyip Erdoğan criticized the USA Government for being silent after Doğan's death. He asked: "Why is his death not followed by the USA, is it because of his Turkish origin?"

=== Center for Constitutional Rights lawsuit ===
In May 2011, the Center for Constitutional Rights filed a Freedom of Information Act lawsuit against the U.S. government to release documents related to its knowledge and role in the attack, which it has thus far blocked.

== See also ==
- Ayşenur Ezgi Eygi - American and Turkish activist killed by IDF Soldiers in 2024
