= History of Palestinians in Los Angeles =

Los Angeles County contains a community of Palestinian Americans.

There are about 15,000 Palestinians in Greater Los Angeles.

== History ==
The first wave of Palestinian migration to the United States occurred in 1908 when the Ottoman Empire began mandating military service for Palestinians. The second wave came after the 1948 Palestinian expulsion and flight during the 1948 Palestine war. This expulsion or flight, which displaced more than 700,000 people, is known by Palestinians as the Nakba. The third and largest wave occurred in 1967 as a result of the Six-Day War in Israel. Although the majority of Palestinian immigrants settled on the East Coast, economic opportunity brought large concentrations of Palestinians to Los Angeles.

== Demographics ==
No reliable immigration or census figures exist for Palestinian Americans. The count of Palestinian-Americans is complicated by the lack of a Middle East origin box to check on Census forms, leading the majority of Palestinians to self report as "white." The population of the Palestinian diaspora in California is estimated to be 57,222 (after adjusting for undercounting), of which approximately 15,000 live in Los Angeles County. Foreign born Palestinians in Los Angeles County originate mostly from Asia and the Middle East, followed by Latin America.

== Discrimination ==
In the 1970s, a series of terrorist attacks took place against prominent Palestinian-American activists and institutions, culminating in the murder of anti-discrimination activist Alex Odeh in Santa Ana in 1985. In 1987, eight Palestinians were arrested in Los Angeles. They were charged under an antiquated anti-communism law called the McCarran-Walter Act that accused them of "supporting an organization that advocated world communism" for their possible association with the Popular Front for the Liberation of Palestine. According to the ACLU, the eight were "prosecuted for ideas, beliefs and thoughts of a magazine for which none have been writers or editors.”

== Economy ==
As of 2010, there were 1,793 Palestinians over the age of 16 living in the Los Angeles County area, 65% of whom were in the labor force (employed or seeking employment). The unemployment rate at this time was 2.8%: much lower than the national average for the USA. The majority of Palestinians in LA work in the private sector (65% of workers), with 18.4% employed by the Government and 10.2% self-employed. The management, business, science and arts sector employs the highest percentage of Palestinians in LA, followed by sales and office work. Based on the 893 total households included in 2010 US Census data, the mean household income for Palestinians in LA County was $96,729: higher than the national average for the USA.

== Education ==
The majority of Palestinians in LA enrolled in school attend elementary school, followed by graduate school and college. 46.8% of the Palestinian Diaspora in LA over 25 years old hold a bachelor's degree or higher and 89.6% are educated to high school level or higher.

== Institutions ==
The Palestinian diaspora in Los Angeles has a variety of organizations and institutional groups.

Political organizations with chapters in Los Angeles include: Al-Awda, dedicated to the Palestinian right of return, Palestinian American Women's Association, which works toward the empowerment and education of Arab American women and children, and American Muslims for Palestine, which works toward educating people about Palestine in order to motivate changes in US foreign policy regarding Palestine.

Los Angeles County also has humanitarian relief organizations such as: Palestinian Children's relief, a non profit which focuses on providing medical relief and aid for younger Palestinians in the Middle East, and Islamic Relief which provides humanitarian aid to communities after disasters.

== Notable persons ==
- List of Palestinian Americans
