= Palestinian diaspora =

Palestinian emigrants and their descendants

The Palestinian diaspora, (Note: Arabic: الشتات الفلسطيني, al-shatat al-filastini) part of the wider Arab diaspora, refers to Palestinians living outside the region of Palestine, which includes the modern states of Israel and Palestine. There are about 6.1 million members of the Palestinian diaspora, most of whom live in Jordan, Syria, Lebanon, and Chile.

== History ==
Migration of Palestinians is not a modern phenomenon. Silk workers from Tiberias are mentioned in 13th-century Parisian tax records. However, large-scale emigration of Arab Christians began in the mid-19th century. Contributing factors included economic opportunity, avoidance of military service, and localized conflicts.

The 1922 census of Palestine estimated the Palestinian citizens living abroad as 4,054 Muslims, 6,264 Jews, 10,107 Christians, and 181 Druze.

Since the 1948 Arab–Israeli War, Palestinians have emigrated to host countries around the world. In addition to the 700000 Palestinian refugees of 1948, hundreds of thousands were displaced in the Six-Day War. After 1967, young Palestinian men were encouraged to migrate to South America. These refugees make up the majority of the Palestinian diaspora. Others emigrated for work and educational opportunities. In the decade following the 1967 war, an average of 21000 Palestinians per year were forced out of Israeli-controlled areas. Emigration continued during the 1970s, 1980s, and 1990s.

== Population ==
In the absence of a comprehensive census including all Palestinian diaspora populations and those that remained within the area once known as Mandatory Palestine, exact population figures are difficult to determine. According to the Palestinian Central Bureau of Statistics (PCBS), the number of Palestinians worldwide at the end of 2003 was 9.6 million, an increase of 800000 since 2001.

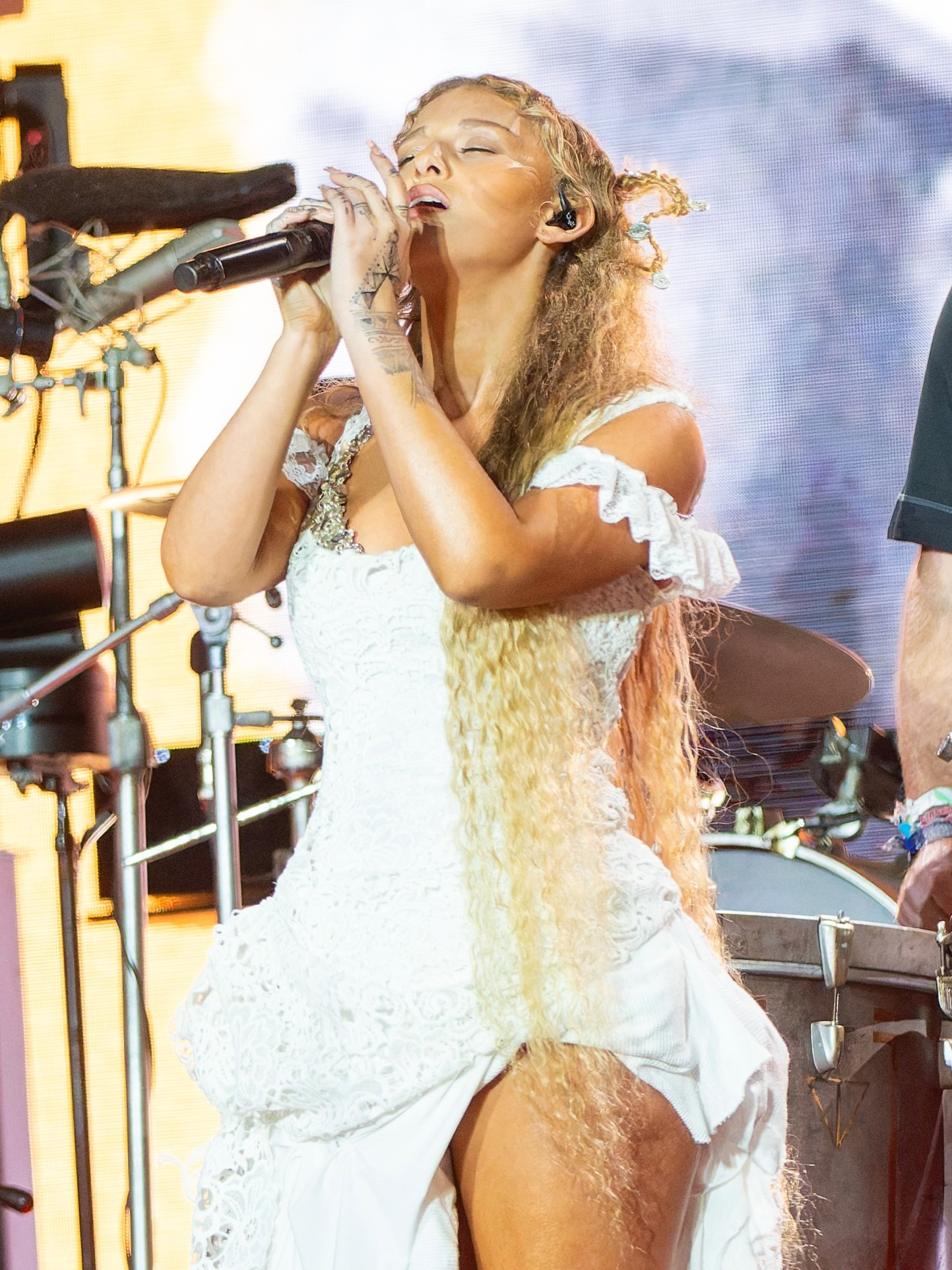
Nazareth-born singer Elyanna, 2024

The issue of the Palestinian right of return has been of central importance to Palestinians and more broadly the Arab world since 1948. In refugee camps such as Ain al-Hilweh, the largest in Lebanon, neighborhoods are named after the Galilee villages from which the original refugees came in 1948, including Az-Zeeb, Safsaf and Hittin. According to a 1999 report by journalist David Hirst, although 97% of the camp's residents had never seen those villages, most still insisted that the right of return was an inalienable right they would never renounce.

== Population figures ==
In 2012, it was estimated that more than 6 million Palestinians live in the diaspora.

The countries outside Palestine and Israel with significant Palestinian populations are:

- Jordan 3240000
- Syria 630000
- Chile 500000 (largest Palestinian community outside the Middle East).
- Lebanon 402582
- Saudi Arabia 280245
- Egypt 270245
- United States 255000 (the largest concentrations in Chicago, Detroit and Los Angeles; History of Palestinians in Los Angeles).
- Honduras 250000
- Guatemala est. 200000
- Mexico 120000
- Colombia est. 100000–150000
- Qatar 100000
- Germany 80000
- Kuwait 80000
- El Salvador 70000
- Brazil 59000
- Iraq 57000
- Yemen 55000
- Canada 50975
- Australia 45000
- Libya 44000
- Puerto Rico est. 30000
- Greece est. 30000
- United Kingdom est. 20000 (2001)–60000 (2017)
- Peru 19000
- Denmark 15000
- Japan est. 10000
- Paraguay 10000
- Netherlands 9000
- Sweden 7000
- Algeria 4030
- Austria 4010
- Norway 3825
- The rest of Latin America, India, Russia, Sub-Saharan Africa and East Asia has fairly small Palestinian populations.

Most of the estimated 100000 Palestinians in the European Union (EU) are in Denmark, France, Germany, Greece, Italy, the Netherlands, Spain and Sweden. Outside the EU is the United Kingdom, Norway and Switzerland. Germany's capital, Berlin, has one of the largest Palestinian communities outside the Middle East with about 30000-40000 people of Palestinian origin residing in the city (~1% of the total population).

In the United States, this includes a Palestinian community of 800-1000 in Gallup, New Mexico, highly involved in the area's Southwest jewelry industry.

== Notable Palestinians in the diaspora ==
- Ricardo Abumohor, Chilean businessman, owner of Primera División club O'Higgins
- Sami Al-Arian, activist and professor
- Sama Alshaibi, Iraqi designer and conceptual artist
- Raed Arafat, Romanian physician and politician, founder of SMURD
- Alex Atala, Brazilian chef
- Belly, Canadian rapper
- Nayib Bukele, President of El Salvador, former mayor of San Salvador
- Nagwa Fouad, Egyptian belly dancer
- Nathalie Handal, Haitian poet and playwright
- Rima Hassan, French politician and member of the European Parliament
- Sam Husseini, American writer and activist
- Antoine Izméry, Haitian businessman and activist
- Raed Jarrar, American architect
- DJ Khaled, American DJ and music producer
- Miguel Littín, Chilean film director
- Lina Meruane, Chilean novelist
- Belal Muhammad, American mixed martial artist and former UFC Welterweight Champion
- Ruba Nadda, Canadian film director
- Salvador Nasralla, Vice President of Honduras, former sports journalist
- Nasri, Canadian pop singer
- Mouin Rabbani, Dutch-Palestinian Middle East analyst
- Edward Said, Palestinian-American intellectual
- Rakad Salem, Iraqi politician
- Linda Sarsour, American political activist
- Rashida Tlaib, American politician, lawyer
- Jorge Yarur Banna, Chilean banker
- Gabriel Zaid, Mexican novelist and poet
- José Zalaquett, Chilean lawyer and human rights activist

== See also ==
- 1948 Palestinian expulsion and flight
- Jewish exodus from Arab and Muslim countries in the 20th century
- 1949–56 Palestinian exodus
- 1967 Palestinian exodus
- Palestinian exodus from Kuwait (Gulf War)
- List of Palestinians
