= Killing of Ayşenur Eygi =

Shooting of Turkish-American activist by Israel Defense Forces

- Part of the Israeli incursions in the West Bank during the Gaza war and the Gaza war protests
- Location: Beita, Nablus, Israeli-occupied West Bank (Palestine)
- Date: 6 September 2024
- Attack type: Homicide by shooting
- Deaths: 1
- Perpetrator: Israel Defense Forces

On 6 September 2024, 26-year-old Ayşenur Ezgi Eygi, a U.S. and Turkish dual citizen, was shot and killed by Israeli military forces during a protest against illegal Israeli settlements near Nablus in the Israeli-occupied West Bank.

Eygi was born in Turkey in 1998 and raised in Seattle, Washington. She arrived in the Israeli-occupied West Bank on 3 September 2024 to engage in activism work with the International Solidarity Movement (ISM).

The weekly protest in Beita against settlement expansion has been held for years and often been the site of Israeli crackdown. Since March 2020, seventeen Palestinians have been killed by Israeli forces while attending the protest, and in August 2024 an American protester was shot in the leg by Israeli forces while fleeing live fire and tear gas. Two other U.S. citizens had been killed in the West Bank since the start of the Gaza war. Eygi was the third to be shot dead by Israeli forces in the West Bank in 2024, after Tawfic Abdel Jabbar and Mohammad Khdour. On each occasion, the U.S. government condemned the killings without investigating. On 10 September 2024, Israel claimed that Eygi was "likely unintentionally shot" by its forces. This has been contested by witnesses and rejected by Eygi's family, who argue that it is inadequate for Israel to investigate itself. Video evidence obtained by The Washington Post also fails to support Israel's story.

== Biography ==
Ayşenur Ezgi Eygi (27 July 1998 – 6 September 2024) was a Turkish-born American human rights activist and peer mentor. She was born in Antalya, Turkey, on 27 July 1998. Her family moved to the United States when she was less than a year old. Eygi was raised in Seattle and attended West Seattle High School. She graduated from Seattle Central College in 2022 with an associate's degree in arts. Later, she graduated from the University of Washington with a major in psychology and a minor in Middle Eastern Languages and Cultures.

Eygi had previously been involved in protests against the Dakota Access Pipeline, and was active in pro-Palestinian activism on the UW campus. She was considering attending graduate school to study Near East archaeology.

Eygi participated in the Faz3a (Faz'a) movement, which fights for the rights of Palestinian farmers persecuted by the Israeli military and attacked by settlers. She was also a member of the Palestinian-led International Solidarity Movement, like Tom Hurndall and Rachel Corrie.

== Background ==
Eygi arrived in the Israeli-occupied West Bank on 3 September 2024 to engage in activism work with the International Solidarity Movement (ISM). According to her family, she had been compelled to travel to the Israeli-occupied West Bank to stand with Palestinian civilians enduring ongoing repression and violence. Two other U.S. citizens have been killed in the West Bank since the start of the Gaza war. It was also the third high-profile killing of a U.S. citizen by Israeli forces in recent years, following the killings of Omar Assad and Shireen Abu Akleh.

The weekly protest in Beita against settlement expansion has been held for years and often been the site of Israeli crackdown. Since March 2020, seventeen Palestinians have been killed by Israeli forces while attending the protest and in August 2024 an American protester was shot in the leg by Israeli forces while fleeing live fire and tear gas. Eygi entered the West Bank at the beginning of September and took part in the weekly protests in Beita. During a communal prayer primarily composed of men and children, IDF soldiers arrived and tried to disperse the group.

== Shooting and death ==
On 6 September 2024, Eygi attended a protest in Beita, near the Israeli settlement of Evyatar. The protest, which is held weekly, calls for the end of Israeli settlement expansion in the West Bank.

According to Haaretz journalist Jonathan Pollak, who attended the event and is an activist with Defend Palestine, Israeli soldiers surrounded the group before a communal prayer held by Palestinian and non-Palestinian activists before the protest got underway. After the prayer, clashes broke out between the soldiers and the protesters. Witnesses reported that IDF forces employed both live fire and tear gas to drive the group back to their villages; in response, the protesters threw stones and then retreated from the area.

An Australian activist told The Washington Post that she and Eygi had meant to avoid rougher protests and, according to Pollak, Eygi was indeed shot during the subsequent calm. Some 20 to 30 minutes after the clashes ceased, soldiers scaled a house and positioned themselves on a rooftop 180 metres (200 yd) away. A protester standing with Eygi said, "We were standing, visible to the army—just standing around not doing anything. Nothing was happening." One soldier fired and a shot ricocheted off a stone and struck a local 18-year-old Palestinian man in the thigh. After a second shot was fired, Pollak reported being called over to help Eygi, whom he found lying under an olive tree with a bullet wound in the head. He added that she lay in the direct line of sight of the soldiers on the rooftop. According to Pollak, the soldiers were under no threat. In a later statement, ISM said that its activists had not thrown rocks at Israeli soldiers, that the demonstration was peaceful, and that no danger to the soldiers was conceivable as they were 200 metres (660 ft) away from the protesters. Footage obtained by the Washington Post shows that Eygi was shot more than 30 minutes after clashes had ended.

According to Pollak, while a clash had occurred in a previous incident that day, soldiers were under no threat, and Eygi was killed during a separate event. He saw two soldiers, positioned atop a nearby house, aiming a gun toward the demonstrators and opening fire. Pollak said that Eygi was 10 meters (33 ft) away from him when she was shot in the head, and that she was bleeding to death next to an olive tree. The ISM contradicted the IDF's claim that its soldiers had been subjected to stone throwing by Eygi's group, saying, “Ayşenur was more than 200 metres (660 ft) away from where the Israeli soldiers were and there were no confrontations there at all in the minutes before she was shot.”

Eygi was brought to Rafidia Surgical Hospital in Nablus, where she was confirmed dead. The hospital director, Fouad Naffa, and another doctor who administered first aid, Ward Basalat, confirmed to the media that Eygi had been shot in the head.

== Aftermath ==
Eygi's remains were repatriated to Turkey and buried at Didim on 14 September in a ceremony attended by Turkish vice president Cevdet Yilmaz, foreign minister Hakan Fidan, Grand National Assembly speaker Numan Kurtulmuş, and Republican People's Party leader Özgür Özel.

== Responses ==
Eygi's family called for an independent investigation into her death. In a statement on social media, they said that Eygi was peacefully protesting when she was killed and that her life was "taken needlessly, unlawfully and violently by the Israeli military". In a public statement, they called on the U.S. government to conduct an independent investigation, saying it would be inadequate for Israel to investigate itself. On September 10, hours after Israel released the conclusion of its inquiry, in which it admitted that it was "highly likely" that Eygi was killed by an Israeli sniper but alleged that it was unintentional, the family released another statement calling the Israeli inquiry "wholly inadequate" and adding, "we are deeply offended by the suggestion that her killing by a trained sniper was in any way unintentional. The disregard shown for human life in the inquiry is appalling."

=== Palestine ===
Secretary General of the Palestine Liberation Organization Hussein al-Sheikh tweeted that Eygi's death was "another crime added to the series of crimes committed daily by the occupation forces". Hamas released a statement condemning the killing as "part of a pattern of violence against foreign supporters of the Palestinian cause, including the notable case of Rachel Corrie". The statement called on the international community to hold the Israeli government accountable.

=== Israel ===
The IDF confirmed on 6 September that troops had fired in Beita "toward a main instigator of violent activity who hurled rocks at the forces and posed a threat to them" and that the "details of the incident and the circumstances in which [Eygi] was hit are under review". The Israel Defense Forces wrote on social media platform X, "The IDF is looking into reports that a foreign national was killed as a result of shots fired in the area. The details of the incident and the circumstances in which she was hit are under review." On 10 September 2024, the IDF stated that it was "highly likely" that she was shot by an Israeli soldier but that her killing was unintentional.

=== International ===
==== United States ====
The US State Department confirmed Eygi's death and identity on 6 September. National Security Council spokesperson Sean Savett said in a statement that the U.S. was "deeply disturbed" by the event and requested that Israel open an investigation into Eygi's death. Secretary of State Antony Blinken also made a statement that the U.S. government would share more information as it became available, and "as necessary, we'll act on it". State Department spokesperson Vedant Patel declined to blame Israel for the killing and said the US government was not planning to press for an independent investigation, as Eygi's family demanded. On 11 September, Vice President Kamala Harris denounced the killing as "tragic" and "unacceptable" and called for "full accountability" for it. The same day, President Joe Biden demanded "full accountability" after initially accepting the Israeli explanation that the incident was accidental, without endorsing an independent investigation or pursuing consequences for the killing.

United States Department of State spokesperson Matthew Miller said: "We are urgently gathering more information about the circumstances of her death, and will have more to say as we learn more. We have no higher priority than the safety and security of American citizens." Michigan Congresswoman Rashida Tlaib called on Blinken to "do something to save lives".

==== Turkey ====
A spokesperson of the Turkish Foreign Ministry, Öncü Keçeli, said that Turkey would exert "all effort to ensure that those who killed our citizen is brought to justice." Another official statement by the Turkish Foreign Ministry said, "We condemn this murder committed by the Netanyahu Government. Israel is trying to intimidate all those who come to the aid of the Palestinian people and who fight peacefully against the genocide. This policy of violence will not work." Turkish President Recep Tayyip Erdogan called the killing "barbaric".

==== Jordan ====
The Foreign Ministry of Jordan condemned Eygi's killing and asked for the perpetrators to be held responsible. It also said that the crime reflected the extremist policies of Israel's government, which "incite hatred, fuel extremism, and encourage settlers to target and kill Palestinians as well as those who stand in solidarity with Palestinians' legitimate rights."

==== Qatar ====
The Qatari Foreign Ministry put out a statement condemning Eygi's killing: "The heinous crime is part of a series of ongoing crimes committed by the Israeli occupation against the Palestinian cause and human rights. The silence of the international community regarding these violations is an incentive for the occupation to commit more atrocities".

=== Organizations ===
United Nations spokesman Stéphane Dujarric said that the UN wanted to see a "full investigation of the circumstances" of the incident. The Euro-Mediterranean Human Rights Monitor expressed "huge shock" following the killing and said it would investigate the incident. The Peace & Justice Project organization said the attack was a result of "an emboldened Israel, committing acts of ethnic cleansing with the support of UK and US governments".

United States National Security Council spokesperson Sean Savett said in a statement to Turkish state-owned Anadolu Agency: “We are deeply disturbed by the tragic death of an American citizen, Aysenur Ezgi Eygi, today in the West Bank and our hearts go out to her family and loved ones”. He added, "We have reached out to the Government of Israel to ask for more information and request an investigation into the incident".

Nablus Governor Ghassan Daghlas in a statement to Reuters said “All legal measures will be submitted to the International Criminal Court” ... “The bullets do not distinguish between a Palestinian, a child, a woman, or any nationality” ... “Now her life is lost, she is an American citizen holding American nationality, which means Israel is crossing all lines.”

== Criticism of U. S. institutional response ==
The Biden–Harris administration has been criticized by members of the US Muslim community and peace advocates for its response to Eygi's killing, which was compared to the much stronger rhetoric employed against Hamas over the killing of American hostage Hersh Goldberg-Polin. Critics noted that the US government had refused to attribute blame to Israel for Eygi's death and had maintained that more information was needed before any action could be taken on the matter, although no such fact-finding mission was launched into Goldberg-Polin's death, which was immediately blamed on Hamas. Arab News noted on September 8 that neither President Joe Biden nor Vice President Kamala Harris had personally lamented Eygi's demise despite doing so for Goldberg-Polin (both eventually did so three days later in separate statements). Echoing the sentiments of Eygi's family, the US's suggestion that Israel investigate itself for the incident was also criticized. CNN noted that the Biden administration has not changed its abundant support for Israeli forces even after they were held responsible for the deaths of American citizens, citing the example of Shireen Abu Akleh. "Over the past nearly 11 months, President Biden has shown daily which lives he values and which lives he deems dispensable. He cannot place his allegiance to this genocidal regime over the lives of his own citizens," said executive director of the Institute for Middle East Understanding Margaret DeReus.

Legacy media was also criticized for failing to clearly identify the Israeli source of the bullet that killed Eygi.

After President Biden endorsed the conclusion from the Israeli initial investigation that Eygi's death was accidental, the victim's partner, Hamid Ali, reiterated the family's skepticism and added that neither President Biden nor the White House has contacted the family since the activist's death. The family said of President Biden's remark that it "is not only insensitive and false, it is complicity in the Israeli military’s agenda to take Palestinian land and whitewash the killing of an American."

Commenting on the parallels between Ezgi's case and that of their late daughter Rachel Corrie, Cindy and Craig Corrie stated that — given Israel's historic refusal to punish soldiers who kill local and foreign activists in Palestine — the US's unwillingness to launch its own investigations into the killing of its citizens by Israeli forces can only be politically motivated.

== See also ==
- American citizens killed by the IDF:
  - Tawfic Abdel Jabbar
  - Mohammad Khdour
  - Rachel Corrie
  - Shireen Abu Akleh – Palestinian-American journalist killed by Israeli forces in 2022.
- Hersh Goldberg-Polin – an American citizen abducted and killed by Hamas
- Israeli occupation of the West Bank
- ISM casualties in Palestine and Israel
- Rachel Corrie - American activist killed by an IDF bulldozer in 2003.
- Iain Hook – British UNRWA project manager shot and killed by IDF during a battle in Jenin, 22 November 2002.
- James Miller – British film-maker shot and killed by the IDF in Gaza, 2 May 2003.
- Vittorio Arrigoni – Italian ISM volunteer abducted and murdered in Gaza by a Salafist militant group.
- Kayla Mueller – American activist and aid worker abducted by ISIS and later killed.
- Furkan Doğan – American-Turkish activist killed by the IDF in the Gaza Flotilla Raid in 2010.
- List of peace activists
