= Death of Omar Assad =

Death of Palestinian-American in Israeli custody

Omar Assad (a.k.a. Omar As'ad) was a 78-year-old American man who died on 12 January 2022 in the custody of Israeli forces. He was detained by troops from the Netzah Yehuda Battalion at a checkpoint at the village of Jilijliya, north of Ramallah. He was handcuffed, gagged and forced to lie on his stomach for between 20 minutes and an hour, dying from a stress-induced cardiac arrest. U.S. State Department spokesman Ned Price said U.S. officials requested "clarification" of events from Israel, saying "We support a thorough investigation into the circumstances." The Israeli authorities announced an investigation. An army report called the incident a "moral failure and poor decision-making."

Subsequently, the U.S. State Department showed particular interest in the Netzah Yehuda battalion. Hady Amr, the administration's point person on Israel-Palestine, visited Assad's family and the U.S. Embassy in Israel was asked to prepare a report on the battalion.

On 9 October, Israel's defense ministry said it would pay the family of the deceased 500,000 shekels (US$141,000) On 16 October, the family of the deceased said they rejected compensation offered in return for dismissing a lawsuit they had submitted before US and Israeli courts.

On 10 November 2022, the Israeli military's legal authority said it was preparing to indict two officers, one who commanded the force at the checkpoint and another in charge of guarding detainees. At the end of November, Israel announced that the Netzah Yehuda battalion would be moved from the West Bank to the Golan Heights but denied that this was related to controversial incidents over the past year including the death of Assad.

In June 2023, the Israeli military announced that soldiers involved in the detention of Omar Assad would be punished but not charged. The military advocate general said there would be no criminal prosecution because a military medic had found it impossible to determine that Omar Assad's death was caused specifically by the soldiers' conduct. Following the Israeli announcement, the United States said that it was seeking more information from the Israeli government about the decision.

In 2024, it was reported that the Biden administration was considering imposing sanctions against the Netzah Yehuda Battalion for its violations of the human rights of the Palestinian people, but in August of this year, US Secretary of State Antony Blinken announced he ultimately decided to hold off any such action on the grounds that the battalion's problems had allegedly been remedied. Relatives and acquaintances of Assad have voiced outrage at the US decision, which they see as evidence of double standards and that the US government treats Palestinian lives as disposable.

== See also ==
- Timeline of the Israeli–Palestinian conflict in 2022
