= Sinjil =

Palestinian town in Ramallah and al-Bireh Governorate, West Bank

- Municipality type C

Arabic transcription(s)
  - Arabic: سنجل
  - Latin: Senjel (official); Sanjil (unofficial)
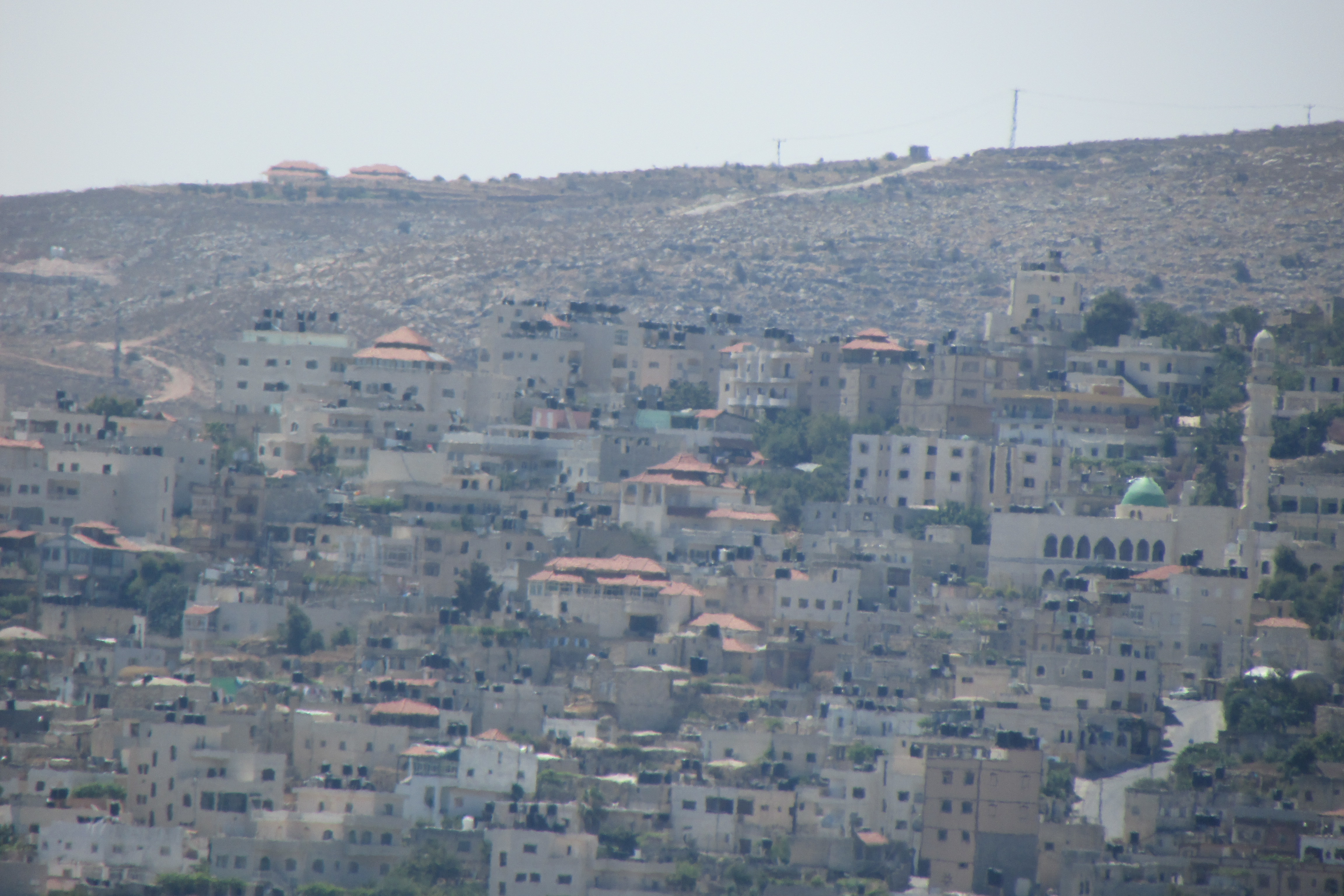

- Location of Sinjil within Palestine
- Coordinates: 32°01′59″N 35°15′51″E
- Palestine grid: 175/160
- State: State of Palestine
- Governorate: Ramallah and al-Bireh Governorate

Government
  - Type: Municipality
  - Head of Municipality: Mutaz Tawafsha
- Elevation: 795 m (2,608 ft)

Population (2017)
  - Total: 5,742
- Name meaning: Saint Gilles

Sinjil (Arabic: سنجل) is a Palestinian town northeast of Ramallah in the Ramallah and al-Bireh Governorate of the State of Palestine, in the central West Bank.

== Location ==
Sinjil is located 15.5 kilometers (9.6 mi) north-east of Ramallah. It is bordered by Turmus Ayya to the east, Al Lubban ash Sharqiya to the north, 'Abwein and Jilijliya to the west, and Al Mazra'a ash Sharqiya to the south. Sinjil is located in the Ramallah and al-Bireh Governorate of the West Bank.

== History ==
Sherds from the Intermediate Bronze Age, Bronze Age, Byzantine, Crusader/Ayyubid and Mamluk periods have been found. Tombs at Sinjil from the Middle Bronze Age have yielded an array of metal weapons.

=== Name origin ===
The village is thought to have taken its name from the Crusader town of St. Gilles, being the home town of French Count Raymond VI of Toulouse who camped here on the First Crusade, before entering Jerusalem. The same man later built a castle in Sinjil to protect the passage of passing caravans.

Doubt over the Crusader origin of the name was raised by historian Levy-Rubin. A Samaritan chronicle (ostensibly by Abu l-Fath), written in the 14th century but based on much older sources, twice refers to a location Sinḥil in the 8th or 9th century. The Arab geographer Zakariya al-Qazwini in his Athar al-bilad cited a 10th-century mention of Sinḥil, though this cannot be verified from extant manuscripts. Levy-Rubin proposes that Sinḥil was the original name of Sinjil, and that the Crusaders' association of the place with St Gilles was prompted by the Arab name rather than the reverse.

In the 1220s Yaqut al-Hamawi described Sinjil as "a small town of the province Filastin. Near it is the pit of Yasuf as Sadik (Joseph)".

=== Crusader church (present mosque) ===
The village paid ecclesiastical tithes to the Church of the Holy Sepulchre in Jerusalem while a Frankish parish, until they were transferred in 1145 to the monastery on Mount Tabor.

Only thirty years later, in 1175, the parish church and tithes were sold back to the Church of the Holy Sepulchre, as the distance from Mount Tabor and expenses were too high. A month later the sale was confirmed by Baldwin, lord of Sinjil.

=== Ottoman period ===
In 1517 the village was incorporated into the Ottoman Empire with the rest of Palestine. In 1596 it appeared in the tax registers as being in the Nahiya of Quds of the Liwa of Quds. It had a population of 55 households, all Muslim, and paid a fixed tax rate of 33,3% on wheat, barley, vineyards, fruit trees, goats and beehives; a total of 9,900 akçe. The Turkish traveler Evliya Çelebi visited Sinjil about 1650. He described it as a village of 200 houses in the district of Jerusalem, populated by rebellious Muslims.

During the early 19th century, Sinjil was a village of 206 taxable men, roughly 800 people. One-eighth of the population were conscripted into the Ottoman army, but were still taxed for 800 people.

French explorer Victor Guérin visited the village in 1870, and described it as "quite crowded", with an estimated 1200 villagers. The village had two abundant springs, with a reservoir connected to the largest. Guérin further noted, "On the summit of the hill are observed the foundations of two strongholds, built of great blocks, evidently ancient, one of which is called the Kasr ("Fort"), and the other the Keniseh ("Church"). The latter is [] built east and west, and may have been a church. On the lower flanks of the hill I found several ancient tombs cut in the rock. One of the largest, preceded by a vestibule, contains two loculi." An Ottoman village list of about the same year, 1870, showed that "Sindschil" had 161 houses and a population of 513, though the population count included only men.

In 1882, the PEF's Survey of Western Palestine described Sinjil as being of moderate size, with several houses of two storeys, on a hill side with fine fig gardens below.

The village mosque is laid out on the lines of the Frankish Crusader church (see section above). Other historical sites in the town include a well for Joseph and a holy site for Jacob. The maqam (shrine) of a holy man, Abu Auf, is also there. Abu Auf is from the time period of Caliph Umar Ibn al-Khattab.

In 1896 the population of Sinjil was estimated to be about 1,131 persons.

=== British Mandate ===
In the 1922 census of Palestine conducted by the British Mandate authorities, Sinjil (called: Senjel) had an entirely Muslim population of 934, while in the 1931 census, the village had 266 occupied houses and a population of 1071, still all Muslims.

In 1922, Tawfiq Canaan documented the belief among some of the villagers that the biblical Joseph was thrown into a pit in the proximity of Sinjil. Locals attributed significance to a well called Bir Sinjil. Some said it was the abode of a saint named Sheikh Saleh, while others said it was connected to the prophet Yusuf.

In the 1945 statistics the population was 1,320 Muslims while the total land area was 14,186 dunams, according to an official land and population survey. Of this, 4,169 were allocated for plantations and irrigable land, 4,213 for cereals, while 47 dunams were classified as built-up (urban) areas.

=== Jordanian period ===
In the wake of the 1948 Arab–Israeli War, and after the 1949 Armistice Agreements, Sinjil came under Jordanian rule. It was annexed by Jordan in 1950.

In 1961, the population of Sinjil was 1,778 persons.

=== Post-1967 ===
Since the Six-Day War in 1967, Sinjil has been under Israeli occupation. The population of Singil in the 1967 census conducted by the Israeli authorities was 1,823, of whom 18 originated from the Israeli territory.

Under the Oslo Accords of 1995, 13.8% of village land was classified as Area A, 34.7% as Area B, while the remaining 51.5% is Area C. Israel has confiscated 447 dunams of Sinjil land in order to construct the Israeli settlement of Ma'ale Levona. In addition four outposts, including Givat Harel, have been established on Sinjil land.

In September 2024, Israel began construction of a metal wall around Sinjil. The wall cut off access to farmland owned by the town's residents. Only one entrance to the town, a military gate controlled by Israeli soldiers, remains open.

Sinjil was the site of the killing of Sayfollah Musallet, a 20-year-old Palestinian American citizen from Florida, on 11 July 2025. He was beaten to death by Israeli settlers, who also shot and killed another 23-year-old man with him. Musallet, also known as Saif, had driven to the town with dozens of other Palestinians seeking to reach their land after the Friday prayer that day when they were attacked by armed settlers. He was the fifth U.S. citizen to be killed in the West Bank since the Gaza war started on October 7, 2023. The village was attacked by settlers in January 2026, The attackers broke into and vandalized residential house in the northern outskirts of the village.

On Sabbath 11 July 2026, the first anniversary of Musallet killing's, four Israeli settlers stopped a CNN vehicle in the Palestinian village of Sinjil, damaging it, and slashing its tires. The police, which arrived at the scene arrested four suspects, who had prepared clubs, a knife, and pepper spray in their own vehicle.

== Urban development ==
According to Amira Hass, Jewish settlers have hampered villagers' access to their traditional lands. In August 2012, the Red Cross helped the villagers to coordinate with the Israeli Civil Administration and the Israel Defense Forces, enabling them to work on 100 hectares of the land accompanied by an escort. In January 2012, the United States Agency for International Development financed road work and renovations of the Abu Bakr as-Saddeeq boys' school in Sinjil.

== Demography ==
According to the Palestinian Central Bureau of Statistics, the town had a population of 5,742 in 2017. The gender makeup consisted of 2,668 males and 2,568 females. There were 1,029 housing units and the average household size was 5.4.

== Literary references ==
In 2007, Aziz Shihab whose family was from Sinjil, wrote a memoir of his journey to the village Does the Land Remember Me? (2007).

His daughter, Naomi Shihab Nye, who stayed there in 1966, aged 14, and recalls her sojourn as having a formative influence on her poetics.

== Bibliography ==
- Barron, J.B., ed. (1923). Palestine: Report and General Abstracts of the Census of 1922. Government of Palestine.
- Conder, C.R. (1877). "Notes from the memoir". Quarterly Statement - Palestine Exploration Fund. 9: 88–89.
- Conder, C.R.; Kitchener, H.H. (1882). The Survey of Western Palestine: Memoirs of the Topography, Orography, Hydrography, and Archaeology. Vol. 2. London: Committee of the Palestine Exploration Fund.
- Ellenblum, R. (2003). Frankish Rural Settlement in the Latin Kingdom of Jerusalem. Cambridge University Press. ISBN 978-0521521871.
- Finkelstein, I.; Lederman, Zvi, eds. (1997). Highlands of many cultures. Tel Aviv: Institute of Archaeology of Tel Aviv University Publications Section. ISBN 965-440-007-3.
- Fetellus (1896). Fetellus (circa 1130 A.D). Palestine Pilgrims' Text Society.
- Government of Jordan, Department of Statistics (1964). First Census of Population and Housing. Volume I: Final Tables; General Characteristics of the Population (PDF).
- Government of Palestine, Department of Statistics (1945). Village Statistics, April, 1945.
- Guérin, V. (1875). Description Géographique Historique et Archéologique de la Palestine (in French). Vol. 2: Samarie, pt. 2. Paris: L'Imprimerie Nationale.
- Hadawi, S. (1970). Village Statistics of 1945: A Classification of Land and Area ownership in Palestine. Palestine Liberation Organization Research Center.
- Hartmann, M. (1883). "Die Ortschaftenliste des Liwa Jerusalem in dem türkischen Staatskalender für Syrien auf das Jahr 1288 der Flucht (1871)". Zeitschrift des Deutschen Palästina-Vereins. 6: 102–149.
- Hütteroth, W.-D.; Abdulfattah, K. (1977). Historical Geography of Palestine, Transjordan and Southern Syria in the Late 16th Century. Erlanger Geographische Arbeiten, Sonderband 5. Erlangen, Germany: Vorstand der Fränkischen Geographischen Gesellschaft. ISBN 3-920405-41-2.
- Le Strange, G. (1890). Palestine Under the Moslems: A Description of Syria and the Holy Land from A.D. 650 to 1500. Committee of the Palestine Exploration Fund.
- Mills, E, ed. (1932). Census of Palestine 1931. Population of Villages, Towns and Administrative Areas. Jerusalem: Government of Palestine.
- Palmer, E.H. (1881). The Survey of Western Palestine: Arabic and English Name Lists Collected During the Survey by Lieutenants Conder and Kitchener, R. E. Transliterated and Explained by E.H. Palmer. Committee of the Palestine Exploration Fund.
- Pringle, D. (1997). Secular buildings in the Crusader Kingdom of Jerusalem: an archaeological Gazetter. Cambridge University Press. ISBN 0521-46010-7. (p. 95)
- Pringle, D. (1998). The Churches of the Crusader Kingdom of Jerusalem. Vol. II L–Z (excluding Tyre). Cambridge University Press. ISBN 0-521-39037-0.
- Robinson, E.; Smith, E. (1841). Biblical Researches in Palestine, Mount Sinai and Arabia Petraea: A Journal of Travels in the year 1838. Vol. 3. Boston: Crocker & Brewster.
- Röhricht, R. (1893). (RRH) Regesta regni Hierosolymitani (MXCVII-MCCXCI) (in Latin). Berlin: Libraria Academica Wageriana.
- Roziére, de, ed. (1849). Cartulaire de l'église du Saint Sépulchre de Jérusalem: publié d'après les manuscrits du Vatican (in Latin and French). Paris: Imprimerie nationale.
- Schick, C. (1896). "Zur Einwohnerzahl des Bezirks Jerusalem". Zeitschrift des Deutschen Palästina-Vereins. 19: 120–127.
- Socin, A (1879). "Alphabetisches Verzeichniss von Ortschaften des Paschalik Jerusalem". Zeitschrift des Deutschen Palästina-Vereins. 2: 135–163.
- Stephan, St. H. (1938). "Evliya Tshelebi's travels in Palestine V". Quarterly of The Department of Antiquities in Palestine. 8 (2). Annotated by L. A. Mayer: 137-156.
- Toledano, E. (1984). "The Sanjaq of Jerusalem in the Sixteenth Century: Aspects of Topography and Population". Archivum Ottomanicum. 9: 279–319.
