= Jiljilyya =

- Municipality type D (Village council)

Arabic transcription(s)
  - Arabic: جلجليّا
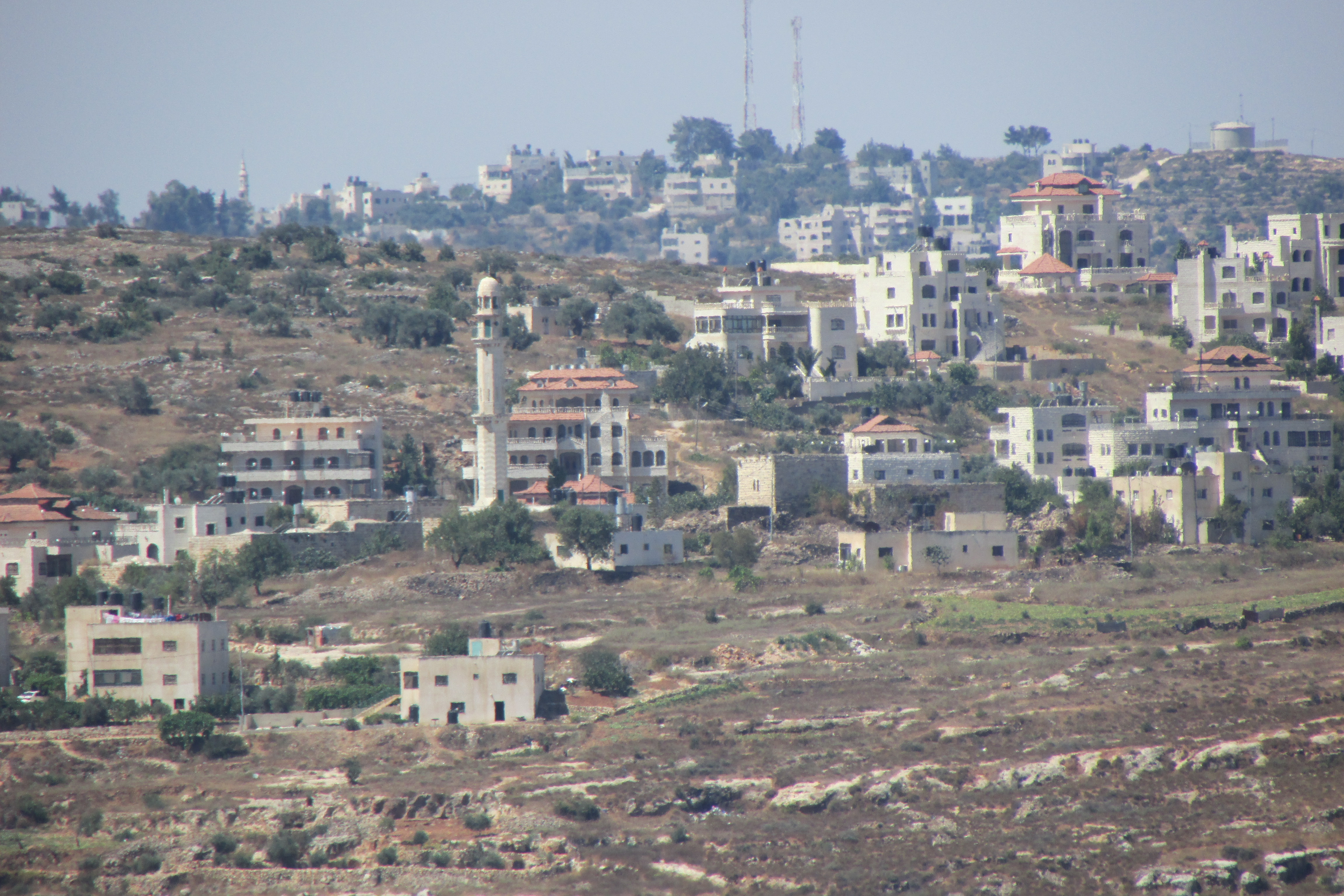
- Jilijliya from the north

- Location of Jiljilyya within Palestine
- Coordinates: 32°01′50″N 35°13′30″E
- Palestine grid: 171/159
- State: State of Palestine
- Governorate: Ramallah and al-Bireh

Government
  - Type: Village council
- Elevation: 749 m (2,457 ft)

Population (2017)
  - Total: 632
- Name meaning: Jiljilia, Jiljilîyeh, from Gilgal

Jiljilyya (Arabic: جلجليّا) is a Palestinian village in the Ramallah and al-Bireh Governorate in the northern West Bank.

== Location ==
Jiljilyya is located (horizontally) 14.11 kilometers (8.77 mi) northeast of Ramallah. It is bordered by Al Mazra'a ash Sharqiya to the east, Sinjil to the east and north, 'Abwein to the north, west and south, and by Silwad to the south.

== History ==
Several scholars have identified Jiljliya as one of several biblical places named Gilgal. Pottery sherds from the Iron Age II, Roman, Byzantine Byzantine/Umayyad, and the Crusader/Ayyubid eras have been found here.

=== Ottoman era ===
The village was incorporated into the Ottoman Empire in 1517 with all of Palestine, and in 1596 it appeared in the Ottoman tax registers as Jinjiliyya, being in the nahiya (subdistrict) of Quds, part of the liwa (district) of Quds. It had a population of 8 households, all Muslims. The villagers paid a fixed tax rate of 33.3% on various agricultural products, including wheat, barley, summer crops, olive trees, vineyards, fruit trees, goats and/or beehives, in addition to "occasional revenues"; a total of 2,600 akçe. Pottery sherds from the early Ottoman era have also been found here.

In 1838 Edward Robinson noted Jiljilia on his travels in the region, and connected it with ancient Gilgal. He further noted it as a Muslim village, located in the Beni Zeid district, north of Jerusalem.

In 1870 Victor Guérin found Djildjilia to have 200 inhabitants, while an Ottoman village list of about the same year counted 14 houses and a population of 49 in dschildschilija, though the population count included only men.

In 1882, the PEF's Survey of Western Palestine (SWP) described Jiljilia as: "A large village on the top of a high hill, with a well to the south, and a few olives. The ridge is arable land."

In 1896 the population of Dschildschilja was estimated to be about 138 persons.

=== British Mandate era ===
In the 1922 census of Palestine conducted by the British Mandate authorities, Jeljelieh had a population of 162 Muslims, increasing in the 1931 census to 212 Muslims, in 47 houses.

In the 1945 statistics, the population was 280 Muslims, while the total land area was 7,283 dunams, according to an official land and population survey. Of this, 1,897 were plantations and irrigable land, 1,940 for cereals, while 16 dunams were classified as built-up (urban) areas.

=== Jordanian era ===
In the wake of the 1948 Arab–Israeli War, and after the 1949 Armistice Agreements, Jiljilyya came under Jordanian rule. It was annexed by Jordan in 1950.

The Jordanian census of 1961 found 490 inhabitants in Jiljiliya.

=== Post-1967 ===
Since the Six-Day War in 1967, Jiljilyya has been under Israeli occupation.

After the 1995 accords, 99.3% of village land was classified as Area A, while the remaining 0.7% was classified as Area B.

==== Death of Omar Assad ====
In January 2022, 78-year-old Omar Assad died after being detained by Israeli soldiers. Assad had lived in the US from 1967, was a US citizen, and had returned to his childhood village for his retirement in 2010. The Israeli spokesman stated that Assad was alive when he was released, but this was contradicted by several eye-witnesses. The autopsy found that he had died from “a stress-induced heart attack probably brought on by being bound and gagged and held in a cold construction site.” In February, the US State Department said it wanted a “criminal investigation” into his death.

In October, Israeli spokesperson claimed that a settlement had been reached with the Assad family, and that Israel would pay them 500,000 shekels, (~$141,000), in return for their withdrawal of the case against the Israeli state. However, the family denied this, saying that they had rejected the offer.

== Bibliography ==
- Albright, W.F. (1922). "Excavations and Results at Tell el-Fûl (Gibeah of Saul)". The Annual of the American Schools of Oriental Research. 4: iii+ix+xi+xiii+1–160. doi:10.2307/3768487. JSTOR 3768487.
- Barron, J. B., ed. (1923). Palestine: Report and General Abstracts of the Census of 1922. Government of Palestine.
- Conder, C.R.; Kitchener, H.H. (1882). The Survey of Western Palestine: Memoirs of the Topography, Orography, Hydrography, and Archaeology. Vol. 2. London: Committee of the Palestine Exploration Fund.
- Dauphin, C. (1998). La Palestine byzantine, Peuplement et Populations. BAR International Series 726 (in French). Vol. III : Catalogue. Oxford: Archeopress. ISBN 978-0-860549-05-5.
- Finkelstein, I.; Lederman, Zvi, eds. (1997). Highlands of many cultures. Tel Aviv: Institute of Archaeology of Tel Aviv University Publications Section. ISBN 978-965-440-007-7.
- Government of Jordan, Department of Statistics (1964). First Census of Population and Housing. Volume I: Final Tables; General Characteristics of the Population (PDF).
- Government of Palestine, Department of Statistics (1945). Village Statistics, April, 1945.
- Guérin, V. (1875). Description Géographique Historique et Archéologique de la Palestine (in French). Vol. 2: Samarie, pt. 2. Paris: L'Imprimerie Nationale.
- Hadawi, S. (1970). Village Statistics of 1945: A Classification of Land and Area ownership in Palestine. Palestine Liberation Organization Research Center.
- Hartmann, M. (1883). "Die Ortschaftenliste des Liwa Jerusalem in dem türkischen Staatskalender für Syrien auf das Jahr 1288 der Flucht (1871)". Zeitschrift des Deutschen Palästina-Vereins. 6: 102–149.
- Hütteroth, W.-D.; Abdulfattah, K. (1977). Historical Geography of Palestine, Transjordan and Southern Syria in the Late 16th Century. Erlanger Geographische Arbeiten, Sonderband 5. Erlangen, Germany: Vorstand der Fränkischen Geographischen Gesellschaft. ISBN 978-3-920405-41-4.
- Mills, E., ed. (1932). Census of Palestine 1931. Population of Villages, Towns and Administrative Areas. Jerusalem: Government of Palestine.
- Palmer, E.H. (1881). The Survey of Western Palestine: Arabic and English Name Lists Collected During the Survey by Lieutenants Conder and Kitchener, R. E. Transliterated and Explained by E.H. Palmer. Committee of the Palestine Exploration Fund.
- Robinson, E.; Smith, E. (1841). Biblical Researches in Palestine, Mount Sinai and Arabia Petraea: A Journal of Travels in the year 1838. Vol. 3. Boston: Crocker & Brewster.
- Schick, C. (1896). "Zur Einwohnerzahl des Bezirks Jerusalem". Zeitschrift des Deutschen Palästina-Vereins. 19: 120–127.
- Socin, A. (1879). "Alphabetisches Verzeichniss von Ortschaften des Paschalik Jerusalem". Zeitschrift des Deutschen Palästina-Vereins. 2: 135–163.
- Velde, van de, C.W.M. (1858). Memoir to Accompany the Map of the Holy Land. Gotha: Justus Perthes.
