= Al-Mazra'a ash-Sharqiya =

al-Mazra'a ash-Sharqiya
- Municipality type C

Arabic transcription(s)
  - Arabic: المزرعة الشرقيّة
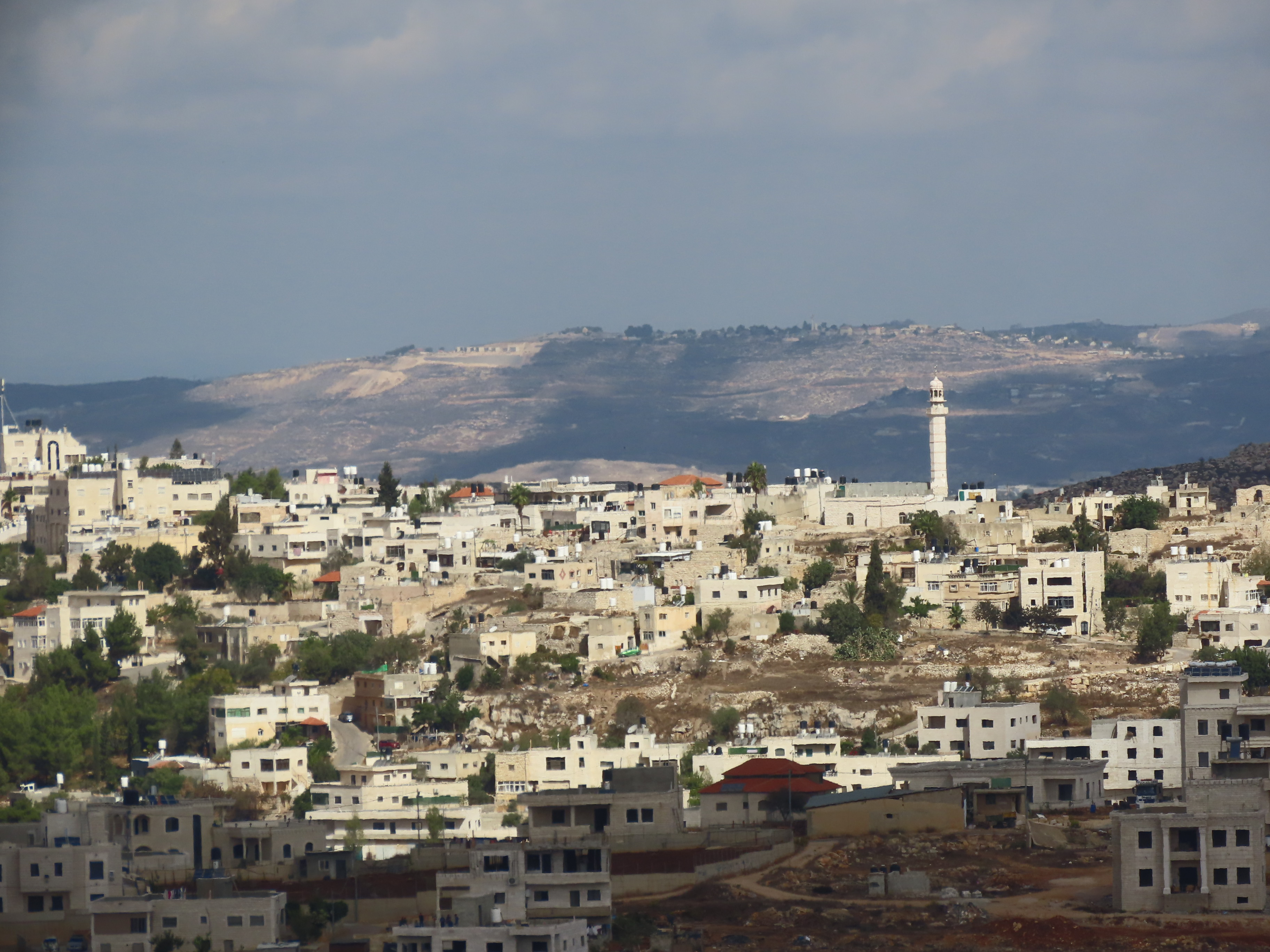
- al-Mazra'a ash-Sharqiya

- Location of al-Mazra'a ash-Sharqiya within Palestine
- Coordinates: 32°00′12″N 35°16′23″E
- Palestine grid: 175/156
- State: State of Palestine
- Governorate: Ramallah and al-Bireh

Government
  - Type: Municipality
- Elevation: 937 m (3,074 ft)

Population (2017)
  - Total: 4,063
- Name meaning: "The eastern sown land"

al-Mazra'a ash-Sharqiya (Arabic: المزرعة الشرقيّة) is a Palestinian town in the Ramallah and al-Bireh Governorate, located northeast of Ramallah in the northern West Bank. According to the Palestinian Central Bureau of Statistics (PCBS), the town had a population of 4,063 inhabitants in 2017.

== Geographic location ==
The village is one of the towns in the Ramallah and Al-Bireh area, located 13 kilometers (8.1 mi) to the northeast of Ramallah. It sits at about 937 meters above sea level. To the north is Sinjil and Turmus Ayya, to the east is Khirbet Abu Falah and Kafr Malik, to the south is Deir Jarir, to the south and west is Silwad, and to the west is Jilijliya.

== History ==
Al-Mazra'a ash-Sharqiya has been identified as the Crusader village named Mezera, and the possible site of a Crusader church. In 1112, Arnulf, the Latin Patriarch of Jerusalem granted the tithes of Mezera to the abbey of St Mary. In 1154 Mezera was mentioned in Crusader texts together with Tarphin. In 1183 Patriarch Heraclius of Jerusalem settled a dispute regarding the tithes of the village.

=== Ottoman era ===
In 1517, the village was included in the Ottoman Empire with the rest of Palestine, and in the 1596 tax-records it appeared as Mazra'at Abu Tasa, located in the Nahiya of Jabal Quds of the Liwa of Al-Quds. The population was 29 households, all Muslim. They paid a fixed tax rate of 33.3% on agricultural products, which included wheat, barley, olive trees, vineyards and fruit trees, occasional revenues, goats and beehives; a total of 3,500 akçe.

In 1838 el-Mezra'ah was noted as a Muslim village, part of Beni Murrah district, located north of Jerusalem.

An Ottoman village list of about 1870 showed that “el-Mezraa” had 177 houses and a population of 641, though the population count included men, only. It also noted that it is located south of Turmus Ayya.

In 1882, the PEF's Survey of Western Palestine described Al-Mazra'a ash-Sharqiya as: "A large village on a hill-top, the hill-sides covered with vineyards; there are also olives and figs. The houses are of stone and adobe."

In 1896 the population of Mezraa, located in the Beni Murra region, was estimated to be about 801 persons.

=== British Mandate era ===
In the 1922 census of Palestine, conducted by the British Mandate authorities, al-Mazra'a ash-Sharqiya had a population of 824 Muslims, increasing in the 1931 census to 1,191, still all Muslims, in a total of 247 houses.

In the 1945 statistics the population was 1,400 Muslim, while the total land area was 16,333 dunams, according to an official land and population survey. Of this, 7,082 were allocated for plantations and irrigable land, 3,831 for cereals, while 91 dunams were classified as built-up (urban) areas.

=== Jordanian era ===
In the wake of the 1948 Arab–Israeli War, and after the 1949 Armistice Agreements, Al-Mazra'a ash-Sharqiya came under Jordanian rule.

The Jordanian census of 1961 found 1,929 inhabitants here.

=== Post-1967 ===
Since the Six-Day War in 1967, Al-Mazra'a ash-Sharqiya has been under Israeli occupation.

After the 1995 accords, 10.1% of village land was classified as Area A, 71% as Area B, the remaining 18.9% as Area C. The Israelis have confiscated village land for the construction of Israeli bypass roads, to various Israeli military bases.

The town's many enormous and elaborate mansions have led it to be called the "Miami of the West Bank", according to the BBC. The wealth is not from local sources, but from the Palestinian diaspora.

In December 2025 a residential building was damaged in an Israeli settler arson attack.

=== Notable Descendants ===
DJ Khaled's father is originally from Al-Mazra'a ash-Sharqiya.

== Bibliography ==
- Barron, J.B., ed. (1923). Palestine: Report and General Abstracts of the Census of 1922. Government of Palestine.
- Conder, C.R.; Kitchener, H.H. (1882). The Survey of Western Palestine: Memoirs of the Topography, Orography, Hydrography, and Archaeology. Vol. 2. London: Committee of the Palestine Exploration Fund.
- Delaborde, H.-François (Henri-François) (1880). Chartes de Terre Sainte provenant de l'Abbaye de N. D. de Josaphat (in French and Latin). Paris: E. Thorin.
- Finkelstein, I.; Lederman, Zvi, eds. (1997). Highlands of many cultures. Tel Aviv: Institute of Archaeology of Tel Aviv University Publications Section. ISBN 965-440-007-3.
- Government of Jordan, Department of Statistics (1964). First Census of Population and Housing. Volume I: Final Tables; General Characteristics of the Population (PDF).
- Government of Palestine, Department of Statistics (1945). Village Statistics, April, 1945.
- Hadawi, S. (1970). Village Statistics of 1945: A Classification of Land and Area ownership in Palestine. Palestine Liberation Organization Research Center. Archived from the original on 2018-12-08.
- Hartmann, M. (1883). "Die Ortschaftenliste des Liwa Jerusalem in dem türkischen Staatskalender für Syrien auf das Jahr 1288 der Flucht (1871)". Zeitschrift des Deutschen Palästina-Vereins. 6: 102–149.
- Hütteroth, W.-D.; Abdulfattah, K. (1977). Historical Geography of Palestine, Transjordan and Southern Syria in the Late 16th Century. Erlanger Geographische Arbeiten, Sonderband 5. Erlangen, Germany: Vorstand der Fränkischen Geographischen Gesellschaft. ISBN 3-920405-41-2.
- Mills, E., ed. (1932). Census of Palestine 1931. Population of Villages, Towns and Administrative Areas. Jerusalem: Government of Palestine.
- Palmer, E.H. (1881). The Survey of Western Palestine: Arabic and English Name Lists Collected During the Survey by Lieutenants Conder and Kitchener, R. E. Transliterated and Explained by E.H. Palmer. Committee of the Palestine Exploration Fund.
- Pringle, D. (1998). The Churches of the Crusader Kingdom of Jerusalem: L-Z (excluding Tyre). Vol. II. Cambridge University Press. ISBN 0-521-39037-0.
- Robinson, E.; Smith, E. (1841). Biblical Researches in Palestine, Mount Sinai and Arabia Petraea: A Journal of Travels in the year 1838. Vol. 3. Boston: Crocker & Brewster.
- Röhricht, R. (1887). "Studien zur mittelalterlichen Geographie und Topographie Syriens". Zeitschrift des Deutschen Palästina-Vereins. 10: 195–344.
- Röhricht, R. (1893). (RRH) Regesta regni Hierosolymitani (MXCVII-MCCXCI) (in Latin). Berlin: Libraria Academica Wageriana.
- Schick, C. (1896). "Zur Einwohnerzahl des Bezirks Jerusalem". Zeitschrift des Deutschen Palästina-Vereins. 19: 120–127.
- Socin, A. (1879). "Alphabetisches Verzeichniss von Ortschaften des Paschalik Jerusalem". Zeitschrift des Deutschen Palästina-Vereins. 2: 135–163.
- Toledano, E. (1984). "The Sanjaq of Jerusalem in the Sixteenth Century: Aspects of Topography and Population". Archivum Ottomanicum. 9: 279–319. Archived from the original on 2016-03-05.
