= Palestinian Americans =

Americans of full or partial Palestinian descent

فلسطينيو أمريكا (Arabic)

Total population
- ~160,000 (2023 American Community Survey; 0.05% of U.S.'s population)

Regions with significant populations
- Chicago • New York City and Northern New Jersey • Philadelphia • Houston • Detroit • New Orleans • Los Angeles Metropolitan area • San Francisco Bay Area

Languages
- English, Arabic

Religion
- Islam, Christianity

Related ethnic groups
- Other Arabs, Arab Americans

Palestinian Americans (Arabic: فلسطينيو أمريكا, romanized: Filasṭīnīyū Amrīkā) are Americans who are of full or partial Palestinian descent.

There are around 160,000 Palestinian Americans according to the 2023 American Community Survey, making up around 0.05% of the U.S. population.

The Palestinian community is concentrated in the Chicago, New York City, Philadelphia, Houston, and Detroit metropolitan areas, with other populations in the Los Angeles and San Francisco metropolitan areas. Some Palestinians have emigrated to smaller metropolitan or micropolitan/rural areas, such as Gallup, New Mexico, in the late 20th and 21st century.

== History ==
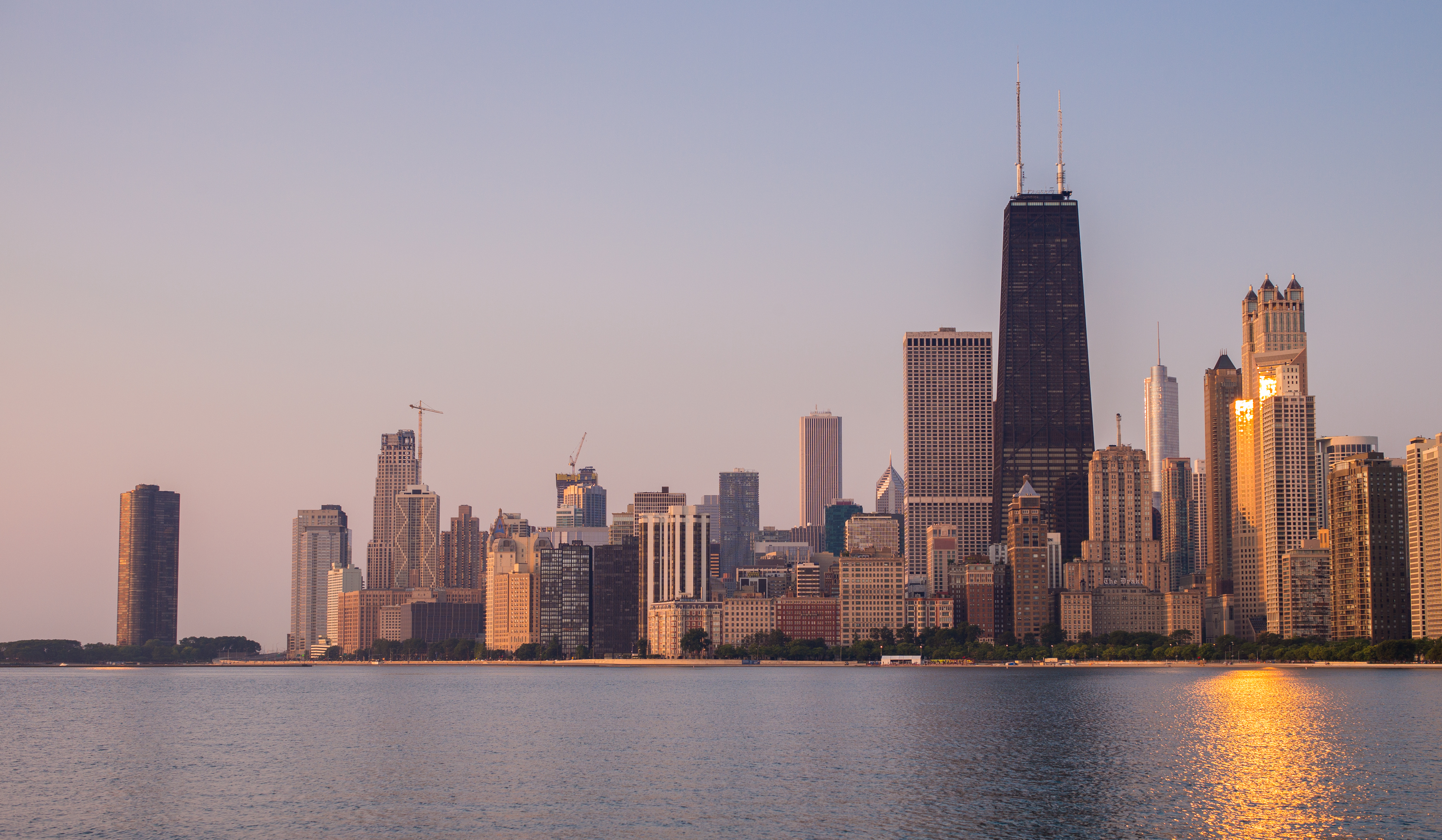
The Chicago metropolitan area is home to the largest Palestinian population in the United States.

=== Early immigration ===
The first Palestinians who immigrated to the United States arrived after 1908, when the Ottoman Empire passed a new conscription law mandating all Ottoman citizens into the military. These Palestinians were overwhelmingly Christian, and only a minority of them were Muslims. The 1922 census of Palestine lists 1,778 Palestinians living abroad in the United States (1,352 Christian, 426 Muslim, along with 19 Druze), the second highest number behind the group listing of South and Central American republics. Palestinian immigration began to decline after 1924, with a new law limiting the number of immigrants, as well as the Great Depression, which heavily reduced immigration.

=== Palestinian exodus ===
The population in the United States began to increase after World War II. During the 1950s, many Christians from Ramallah started immigrating to the states, then followed by Muslims from nearby towns. The establishment of the state of Israel led to many Palestinian Jews becoming Israeli citizens, and those that remained Palestinian were principally Arab, many of whom were then displaced in the Nakba due to the 1948 Arab–Israeli War. However, the greatest wave of Palestinian immigration began in 1967 after the Six-Day War, or as Middle Easterners and North Africans call it, the June War. This wave of immigrants reached its peak in the 1980s.

=== Modern history ===
After the Immigration and Nationality act of 1965 was enacted, many Palestinians started immigrating again into the United States. Most Palestinians that immigrated to the United States in this period were more educated than the Palestinians that arrived before 1965, due to the preferential status for educated immigrants, and a "brain drain" of professionals and the more educated Palestinians.

Beginning in the 1990s, many Palestinian communities were subject to intensive government surveillance under Operation Vulgar Betrayal (OVB), an FBI-led dragnet operation launched in collaboration with Israeli intelligence which sought to uncover networks of financial support for Hamas and Hezbollah among Palestinian Americans. These suspicions proved to be unsubstantiated, and no terrorism-related convictions were ever made. In 2015, filmmaker Assia Boundaoui produced a documentary on the experience of Palestinians living in Bridgeview, Illinois, revealing the unscrupulous tactics used by the FBI as well as the total lack of transparency surrounding the surveillance effort.

== Demographics ==
=== U.S. cities ===
Chicago, Illinois, is home to the largest Palestinian concentration among US metropolitan areas: There is an estimated population of 85,000 Palestinians in greater Chicagoland, and Palestinians form 60% of the Arab community in the region. Bridgeview, Illinois (often referred to as "Little Palestine"), and its surrounding suburbs in southwest Cook County also have a significant population of Palestinian Americans, alongside a large Jordanian American community. The southwest suburban Palestinian community features prominently in Ta-Nehisi Coates' 2024 book, The Message, with the author visiting a survivor of the Deir Yasin Massacre now living in Orland Park, Illinois, and dining in a Middle Eastern restaurant alongside local Palestinian activists and leaders.

A large number of Palestinians settled in the areas surrounding Paterson, and Bay Ridge, which together make up the New York metropolitan area. Many other Palestinians settled in the Houston metropolitan area, Los Angeles metro area, Metro Detroit, Greater Cleveland, Metro New Orleans, Metro Jacksonville, and Metro Miami. Paterson, New Jersey, has its southern half of the city nicknamed Little Ramallah, with an Arab American population estimated as high as 20,000 in 2015. It is one of the most concentrated areas of Palestinian Americans in the entire United States. It is also called Little Istanbul, since it also has a growing Turkish American community.

Bay Ridge's Arab community in Brooklyn, New York, is also a significant neighborhood home to an estimated population of 35,000, of which its largest Arab ethnic groups are Palestinians and Yemenis. However, it is also home to many other Arab ethnic groups, making Bay Ridge's Arab community a diverse population.

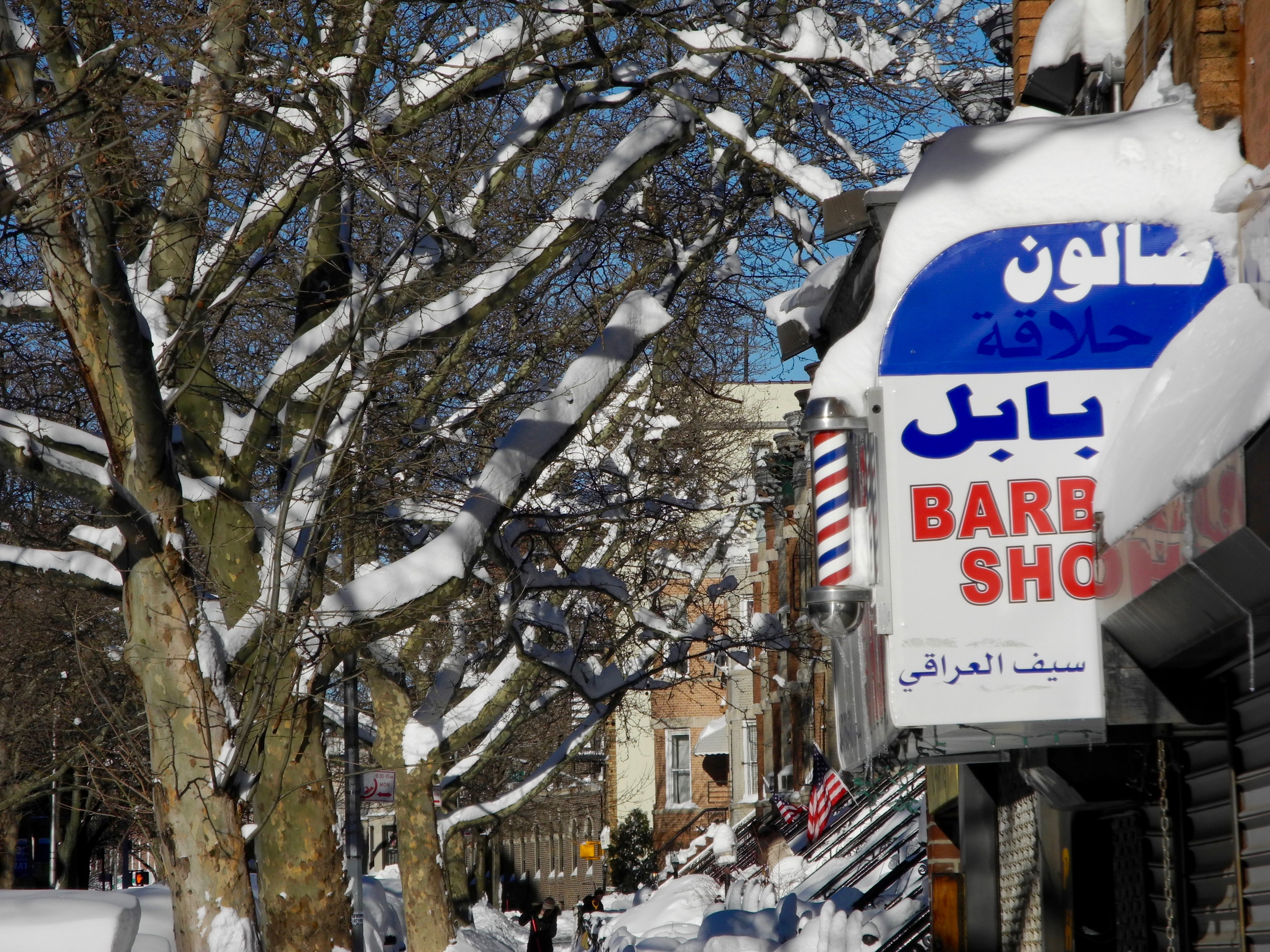
Bay Ridge in Brooklyn, New York City; also has a strongly diverse Arab community, in which its largest Arab groups are Palestinians and Yemenis. Its strong presence is noticeable from Arab shops to Babel Barber Shop, shown above during the January 2016 snow storm.

There are nearly 3,000 Palestinians in San Mateo County, accounting for a half percent of its population; while still small on a large scale, it is ten times higher than the national rate of Palestinians Americans. The San Francisco Bay Area, including San Francisco proper, has had a history of Palestinian settlement since the early 20th century.

According to the 2000 United States census, there were 72,112 people of Palestinian ancestry living in the United States, increasing to 171,969 by the 2022 American Community Survey. It is difficult to count the numbers of Palestinian Americans, since the United States does not recognize Palestine as a country, and only recognizes "Palestinian" as a nationality.

Top 10 Cities with the Largest Palestinian Community in the United States are, according to Zip Atlas:

Rank	City	No. of Palestinians
1	New York, NY	4,376
2	Chicago, IL	2,554
3	Houston, TX	2,134
4	Philadelphia, PA	1,971
5	Orland Park, IL	1,876
6	Los Angeles, CA	1,861
7	Tinley Park, IL	1,381
8	Cleveland, OH	1,285
9	Columbus, OH	1,211
10	Alafaya, FL	1,170

Also according to Zip Atlas, the top 10 Cities with the Highest Percentage of Palestinian Population in the United States are:

Rank	City	Percent of Population as Palestinian
1	Junction, IL	16.07%
2	Orland Hills, IL	13.51%
3	Apple Mountain Lake, VA	9.20%
4	Chicago Ridge, IL	7.87%
5	Clarkson, NY	7.62%
6	Willards, MD	6.52%
7	Hickory Hills, IL	6.10%
8	Spring Valley Village, TX	5.57%
9	Bridgeview, IL	5.28%
10	Roseland, IN	4.99%

=== Religion ===
Palestinian Muslim Americans practice the Sunni sect of Islam, of the Hanafi and Shafi'i madhab.

A large part of Palestinian Christians belong to the Greek Orthodox Church of Jerusalem, with a significant presence of the Latin and Melkite church followers. Smaller minorities adhere to various sects of Protestantism.

=== Language ===
Besides English, many Palestinian Americans speak Palestinian Arabic. Palestinians who once lived or worked in Palestine may have spoken Modern Hebrew as a second language. Many Palestinians are fluent in other languages.

=== Education ===
In the United States approximately 46% of Palestinians have obtained at least a college degree, compared to 18% of the American population. The study of culture and the Arabic language is increasingly important among Palestinians, especially in college and graduate school. Thus, some Palestinian or Arab organizations are working to monitor and improve the teaching of Arab history and culture in the American schools. Palestinians, along with Jordanians, have one of the highest education rates among the Arab countries.

=== Socioeconomics ===
Among the 90 percent of Palestinian American men and 40 percent of women who are in the labor force, 40 percent and 31 percent, have either professional, technical, or managerial positions. There are also large numbers in sales: 26 percent of men, and 23 percent of women. The self-employment rate for men is a significant 36 percent (only 13 percent for women), compared to 11 percent for non-immigrant men. Of the self-employed, 64 percent are in retail trade, with half owning grocery stores. In terms of income, the mean for Palestinian families in 1979 was $25,400,(adjusted for inflation $109,728) with 24 percent earning over $35,000 and 20 percent earning less than $10,000.

== Culture ==
Palestinian culture is a blend of Eastern Mediterranean influences. Palestinians share commonalities with nearby peoples of the Levant, including Lebanese, Syrians, and Jordanians.

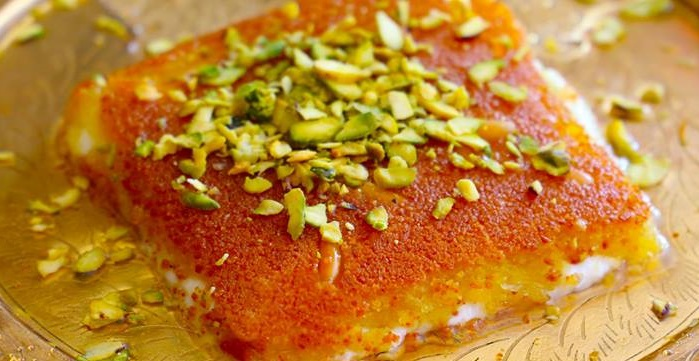
Kanafeh is a popular Palestinian dessert which originated from Nablus. Kanafeh is becoming very popular in the United States, including New York City.

=== Cuisine ===
Palestinians cook many similar foods to the Levant. Examples are kanafeh, hummus, falafel, musakhan, waraq al-'inib, and other Palestinian dishes. These foods, such as Kanafeh, have been very popular in the United States, such as in New York City.

=== Business ===
Palestinian Americans have owned Middle Eastern groceries, shops and restaurants ever since their immigration to the United States. Most of these businesses are in large cities such as New York City and Chicago.

== Notable figures ==
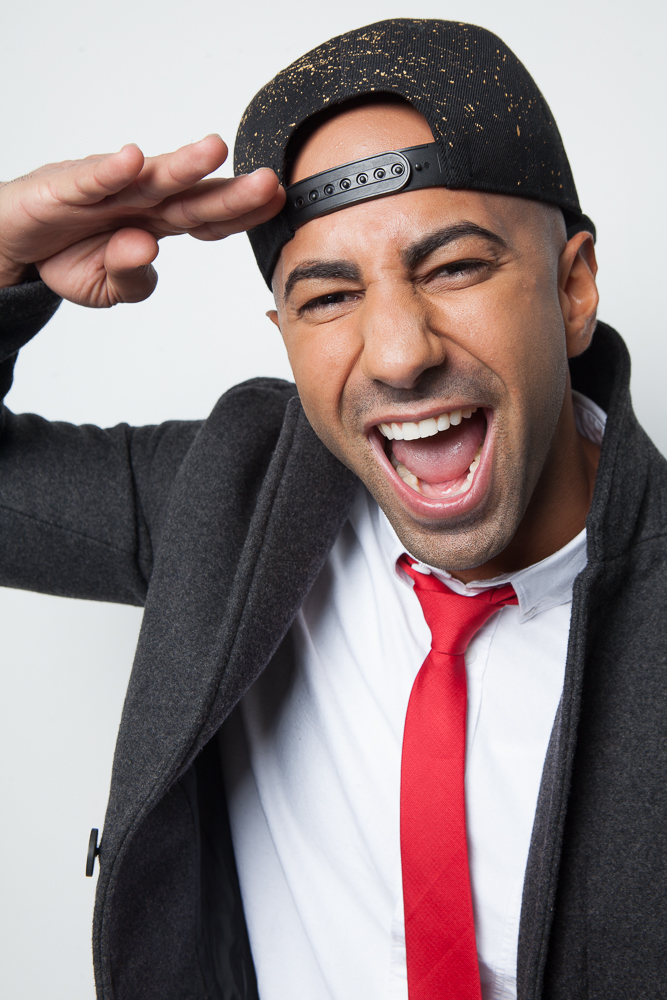
Yousef Saleh Erakat, better known as FouseyTube, is a successful Palestinian American YouTuber and online streamer

Edward Said was a U.S. naturalized Palestinian professor at Columbia University, and widely known as the "Father of Orientalism". He was also a strong voice and advocate for the American Arab Anti Discrimination Committee (ADC) and studied the breaches of civil liberties of Arabs and Muslims in the United States during the 1990s and later after hijacking on September 11th 2001.

Rashid Khalidi is a Palestinian-American historian of the Middle East and former Edward Said Professor Emeritus of Modern Arab Studies at Columbia University. His many works include the 2020 publication of The Hundred Years' War on Palestine: A History of Settler Colonialism and Resistance, 1917-2017, in which he examines the Zionist claim to Palestine through the lens of settler colonialism and European and American imperialism. Khalidi retired from his position at Columbia University in October 2024.

Huwaida Arraf is a Palestinian activist, author and lawyer based in the city of Ramallah who founded an organization called the International Solidarity Movement (ISM) which seeks to help the Palestinian side of the Israeli–Palestinian conflict through non-violent protests. She was also part of a peace initiative called Seeds of Peace which sought to create communication between Palestinian and Jewish youth.

Ismail al-Faruqi was a Palestinian-American philosopher and theologian, known for his significant contributions to Islamic studies and the philosophy of religion. He founded the International Institute of Islamic Thought (IIIT) and was a leading figure in the Islamization of knowledge, advocating for the integration of Islamic principles with contemporary academic disciplines. Al-Faruqi's work emphasized the importance of cultural and religious understanding in addressing global issues.

Khaled Mohamed Khaled, better known by his stage name DJ Khaled, is an American hip hop artist and record producer of Palestinian descent who rose to fame in the 2000s with the debut of his first album Listennn... the Album which reached the 12th spot on the US Billboard 200 chart.

Gigi Hadid and Bella Hadid, two sisters who are both models, are of Palestinian descent through their father Mohamed. Both sisters have expressed their public support for Palestine.

Belal Muhammad, the current UFC Welterweight Champion was born and raised in Chicago, Illinois, to Palestinian parents. He often drapes the Palestinian flag around his shoulders both before and after his fights and is vocal in his support for a Free Palestine.

== Politics ==
=== Domestic politics ===
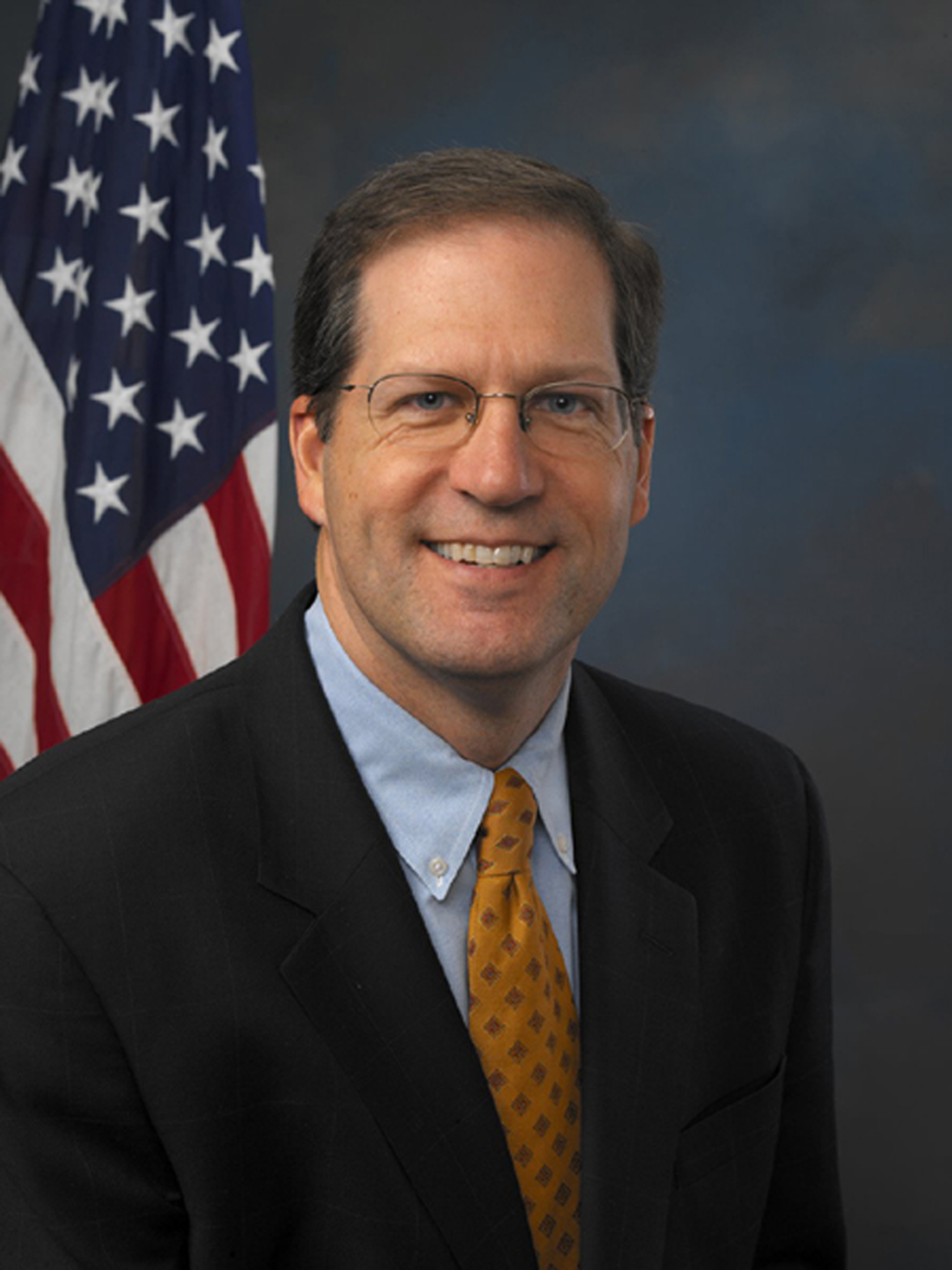
John E. Sununu (R), the first Palestinian-American elected to Congress.

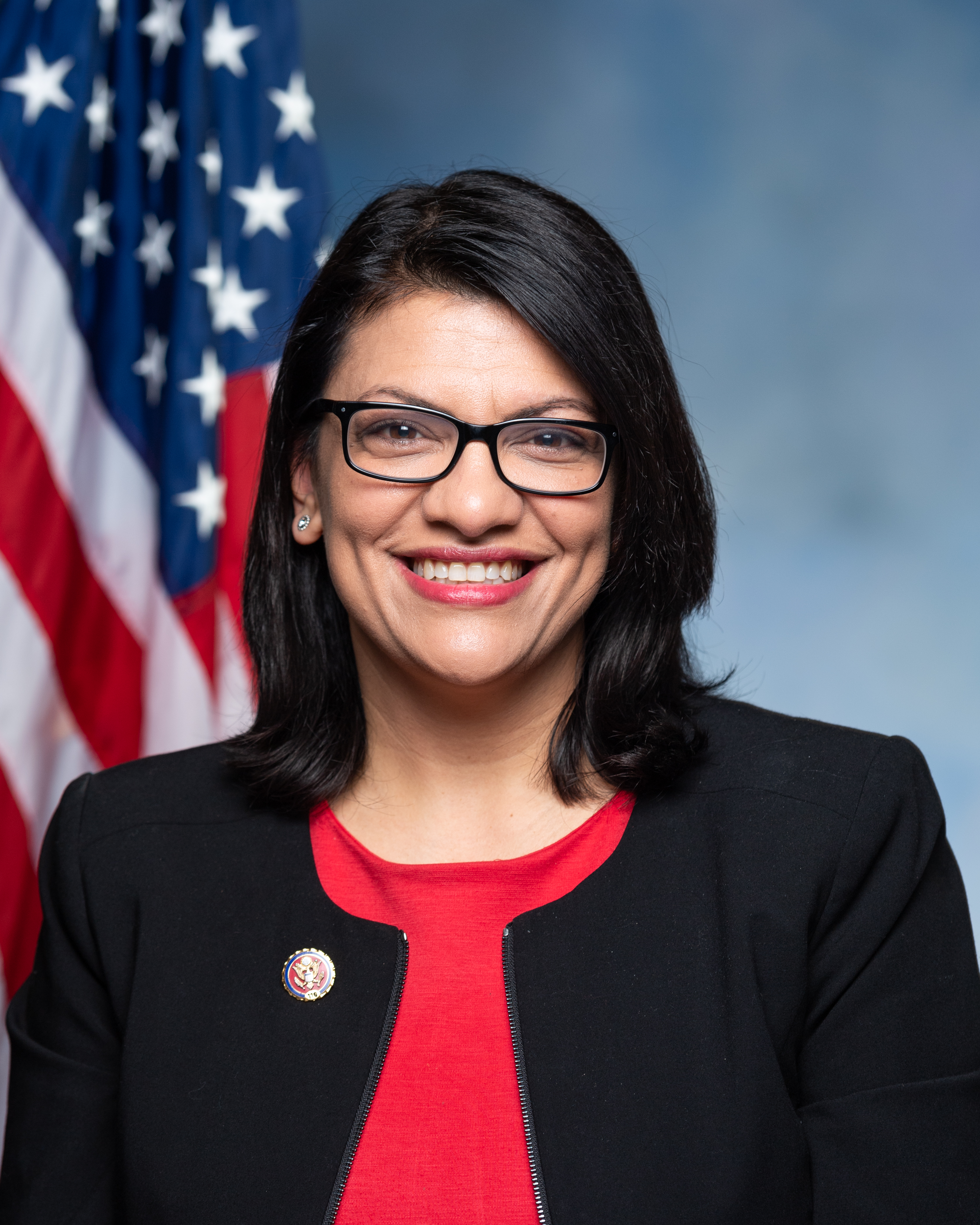
Rashida Tlaib (D), the first Palestinian-American woman elected to Congress.

A poll in October 2016 found that 60% of Arab-American (including Palestinian-Americans) voters voted for Hillary Clinton (with 26% voting for Donald Trump). The survey found evidence of continued movement by Arab-American voters away from the Republican Party, and that 52% of voters identified as Democrats with only 26% calling themselves Republicans.

==== 2016 Election ====
Arab Americans who supported Hillary Clinton believed that addressing gun violence, health care, and Social Security were important to electing the President, while those who supported Donald Trump saw combatting terrorism, further regulating government spending, and creating stricter immigration policies as of chief importance after "Jobs and the economy". Both groups believed Hillary Clinton to be a stronger choice when it came to improving education and resolving racial tensions.

==== 2020 Election ====
Despite 26% of Arab-Americans voting for Trump in 2016, the President's Pro-Israel policies such as the recognition of Jerusalem as Israel's capital by moving the American Embassy from Tel Aviv to Jerusalem considerably lessened his support from Arab-Americans and Palestinian-Americans in particular. Initiatives such as "Yalla Vote" formed to encourage Arab voters to register and participate in the 2020 Election and boost the number of Arab-American votes. An exit poll indicated that the majority of Arab and Muslim Americans supported Biden in the election, with as much as 81% of Muslim voters casting their support in his favor.

==== 2024 Election ====
In the leadup to the 2024 election, Palestinians and Arab Americans more broadly were considered a key electorate, particularly in Michigan, which is considered an essential swing state for winning the election. Prominent Arab groups from Michigan had pressured Vice President and presidential candidate Kamala Harris to break from President Biden's staunchly pro-Israel policy and act to end the Gaza war. Other groups with Michigan roots, such as the Uncommitted Movement, decided not to support Harris while urging voters not to support Trump either.

In response to concerns, Harris made efforts to reach out to Arab American leaders in the community, setting up a meeting in which she discussed her consternation about the scale of suffering in Gaza and her efforts to end the war the war there. Harris' VP-pick, Minnesota governor Tim Walz, separately addressed Democratic Muslim groups with a promise to keep an open door to discussion and working to secure an end to the war, simultaneously pointing to Trump's documented history of Islamophobic policies and anti-Palestinian rhetoric.

Granular data following Harris' defeat showed Trump and Jill Stein coming away with a substantial portion of the Arab Muslim vote; in the Detroit suburb of Dearborn, Trump won 42% of votes, followed by Harris at 36% and Stein at 18%. While demographic groups across Michigan trended to the right from 2020, the change was particularly pronounced in Dearborn, which had overwhelmingly supported Biden (by a 3:1 margin) in 2020. A similar swing was noted in Hamtramck, Michigan, the first majority-Muslim city in the US. With an estimated 200,000+ registered Muslim voters in Michigan, and Trump's winning margin of 84,000 votes, the lost Muslim and Arab votes significantly harmed Harris' bid to win Michigan.

Exit polls found that between 50 percent and 63 percent of US Muslim voters supported Harris. Several Muslim and Arab voters who pivoted from supporting Biden in 2020 to Trump or Stein in 2024 mentioned wanting to exact accountability and punish Democrats for their perceived complicity in the Gaza genocide, as well as an inability to procure a sustained ceasefire.

=== Government ===
Ammar Campa-Najjar is a Democratic candidate of Palestinian and Mexican Heritage from East County who ran for Congress to represent California's 50th congressional district in 2020. Ammar worked as a campaign official in San Diego raising awareness and helping to get President Barack Obama reelected in 2012. His opponent in the 2020 electoral season is Darrell Issa (another Arab-American of Lebanese, German and Bohemian (Czech) ancestry).

Only a couple Americans of Palestinian ancestry have served or are currently serving as members of Congress. Rashida Tlaib, an American born to Palestinian parents, is a Democratic congresswoman of the Michigan House of Representatives, who ran for U.S. House of Representatives seat from Michigan's 13th congressional district. She became one of the first Muslim women elected to Congress (along with Somali-American Ilhan Omar of Minnesota), and the first Palestinian-American woman in Congress. Justin Amash was a Republican-turned independent congressman of Palestinian ancestry, serving in the U.S House of Representatives representing Michigan's 3rd District.

At the State level, Athena Salman of the Arizona House of Representatives is of Palestinian ancestry. Palestinian-American Iman Jodeh was elected to the Colorado House of Representatives in the 2020 United States elections. Fady Qaddoura, born on the West Bank was elected to the Indiana Senate in 2020.

== See also ==
- Arab Americans
- Palestinian Christians
- Palestinian cuisine
- Palestinian diaspora
- History of Palestinians in Los Angeles
- Palestine–United States relations
