= List of Palestinian Americans =

This is a list of notable Palestinian Americans, including both original immigrants who obtained American citizenship and their American descendants.

The list is ordered by category of human endeavour. Persons with significant contributions in two fields are listed in each of the pertinent categories, to facilitate easy lookup.

To be included in this list, the person must have a Wikipedia article showing they are Palestinian American or must have references showing they are Palestinian American and are notable.

== List ==
=== Academics ===
- Nadia Abu El Haj, author and professor of anthropology at Barnard College and subject of a major tenure controversy case at Columbia University
- Ibrahim Abu-Lughod, former director of graduate studies at Northwestern University, father of Lila Abu-Lughod
- Lila Abu-Lughod, professor of anthropology and women's and gender studies at Columbia University
- Ismail al-Faruqi, former professor of religion at Temple University and authority on comparative religion & Islam
- Naseer Aruri, Chancellor Professor of Political Science at University of Massachusetts, Dartmouth
- Bilal Ayyub, professor, University of Maryland, College Park
- Hanna Batatu, Marxist historian most known for his work on Iraqi history
- Iymen Chehade, Palestinian-Israeli conflict professor, Columbia College, Art Institute
- Munther A. Dahleh, professor and director at Massachusetts Institute of Technology (Palestinian)
- Musa Dajani, academic Lawyer and Physician, University of California, Davis
- Leila Farsakh, professor of political science at the University of Massachusetts, Boston
- Samih Farsoun, professor of sociology at American University and editor of Arab Studies Quarterly
- Nadia Hijab, journalist with Middle East Magazine and senior fellow at the Institute for Palestine Studies
- Rashid Khalidi, Edward Said Professor of Modern Arab Studies at Columbia University
- Joseph Massad, professor at Columbia University known for his work on nationalism and sexuality in the Arab world
- Ali H. Nayfeh, Palestinian-American mechanical engineer, the 2014 recipient of Benjamin Franklin Medal in mechanical engineering
- Edward Said, professor at Columbia University best known for his work on the subject of Orientalism.
- Rosemarie Said Zahlan, historian, journalist & author, sister of Edward Said
- Steven Salaita, former professor of English at Virginia Tech, winner of Myers Outstanding Book Award for the Study of Human Rights 2007
- Hisham Sharabi, Professor Emeritus of History and Umar al-Mukhtar Chair of Arab Culture at Georgetown University

=== Activists ===
- Alex Odeh, activist tied to the American-Arab Anti-Discrimination Committee

=== Authors, poets, playwrights, and journalists ===
- Ayman Mohyeldin, journalist and broadcaster
- Susan Abulhawa, author
- Ali Abunimah, journalist and co-founder of The Electronic Intifada
- Ramzy Baroud, writer, journalist and founder of Palestine Chronicle
- Ibtisam Barakat, writer and poet
- Jamal Dajani, journalist and television producer
- Suheir Hammad, poet
- Ray Hanania, journalist
- Nadia Hijab, journalist with Middle East Magazine and senior fellow at the Institute for Palestine Studies
- Sahar Khalifeh, novelist and founder of the Women's Affairs Center in Nablus
- Ismail Khalidi, playwright
- Daoud Kuttab, award-winning journalist
- Najla Said, author, actress, playwright, and activist, daughter of Edward Said
- Saleem (Saleem Azzouqa), gay Muslim playwright, actor, DJ, and dancer
- Naomi Shihab Nye, poet, songwriter, and novelist
- Lisa Suhair Majaj, poet and scholar
- Dena Takruri, journalist, on-air presenter, and producer
- Shireen Abu Akleh, journalist and producer

=== Business and commerce ===
- Sam Bahour, co-founder of the Palestine Telecommunications Company, first private telecommunications company in the Middle East
- Mohamed Hadid, luxury real estate developer and businessman
- Bashar Masri, businessman who is involved in building Rawabi, the first Palestinian planned city
- Ramzi Musallam, billionaire financier
- Farouk Shami, founder of Farouk systems, a Houston-based company that manufactures hair care and spa products like CHI hair Irons
- Fares Zeideia, founder of King of Falafel and Shawarma in Astoria

=== Film, performing, and visual arts ===
- Hanan Alattar, operatic singer and actress
- Sama Alshaibi, visual artist
- Mohammed Amer, comedian, writer, actor;
- Charlie Bisharat, Grammy Award-winning violinist
- Rajie Cook, graphic designer, activist, humanitarian, and artist
- Cherien Dabis, film director and actress
- Said Durrah, comedian
- Hanni El Khatib, singer-songwriter and multi-instrumentalist
- Yousef Erakat, YouTuber
- Bella Hadid, model and actress
- Gigi Hadid, model and actress
- Rami Kashou, fashion designer
- Yousef Khanfar, photographer
- Mousa Kraish, actor
- Mai Masri, filmmaker and director
- Jordan Nassar, visual artist
- Sammy Obeid, stand-up comedian
- Dean Obeidallah, comedian
- Tareq Salahi, appeared on television show The Real Housewives of D.C.
- Hamzah Saadah, streamer, YouTube and activist
- Nida Sinnokrot, installation artist and filmmaker
- Josie Totah, actress and comedian
- Issa Twaimz, YouTuber
- Amer Zahr, comedian, author and university lecturer
- Waleed Zuaiter, actor and producer
- Michael Malarkey, actor and musician
- Nasri Tony Atweh, singer-songwriter, and record producer
- May Calamawy, actress
- Yasmine Al-Bustami, actress
- Yasmine Al Massri, actress
- Yassir Lester, stand-up comedian, writer and actor
- Malina Weissman, actress

=== Judiciary ===
- Edward Rafeedie, Federal District Court judge for the Central District of California from 1982 until his death in 2008.

=== Medicine ===
- Laila Al-Marayati, director of women's health at the Eisner Pediatric and Family Medical Center in downtown Los Angeles
- Hashem El-Serag, doctor and medical researcher on Hepatocellular carcinoma (HCC) and the hepatitis C virus

=== Military ===
- Peter R. Mansoor, U.S. Army colonel, executive officer to Gen. David Petraeus during Iraq War troop surge of 2007

=== Musicians ===
- Hanni El Khatib, singer-songwriter and multi-instrumentalist
- Fredwreck, record producer & DJ
- DJ Khaled, record producer & DJ
- Simon Shaheen, oud and violin musician and composer
- Odetari, rapper, singer, songwriter, and record producer

=== Politics ===
- Al Abdelaziz, member of the New Jersey General Assembly
- Imad-ad-Dean Ahmad, head of the Minaret of Freedom Institute, an Islamic libertarian think-tank
- Justin Amash, former Congressman from Michigan
- Huwaida Arraf, co-founder of the International Solidarity Movement
- Mubarak Awad, founder of the Palestinian Centre for the Study of Nonviolence
- Iman Jodeh، first Muslim legislator in Colorado
- Johnny Khamis, member of the San Jose City Council
- Sam Rasoul, member of the Virginia House of Delegates
- Ruwa Romman, member of the Georgia House of Representatives
- Fady Qaddoura, member of the Indiana Senate
- Ibraheem Samirah, member of the Virginia House of Delegates
- Linda Sarsour, executive director of the Arab American Association of New York, civil rights activist, and co-chair of the Women's March on Washington (2017)
- Chris Sununu, Governor of New Hampshire (R) (2017–25), son of Governor John H. Sununu
- John E. Sununu, US Senator from New Hampshire (2003–09) and US representative from New Hampshire (1997-2003), son of John H. Sununu
- John H. Sununu, Governor of New Hampshire (1983–89) and White House Chief of Staff to President George H. W. Bush (1989–91)
- Rashida Tlaib, U.S. Representative from Michigan's 13th Congressional district

=== Religion ===
- Benny Hinn, Pentecostal televangelist
- Omar Suleiman, imam
- Khalil Totah, Quaker pastor

=== Sports ===
- Oday Aboushi, American football player for the Detroit Lions of the National Football League (NFL)
- Hazem Ali, professional wrestling manager known as "Armando Estrada"
- Hanna Barakat, sprinter
- Gibran Hamdan, NFL QB
- Justin Abdelkader, former NHL player
- Adam Shaheen, Former NFL player for the Miami Dolphins
- Omar Jarun, soccer player and member of the Palestine national football team
- Belal Muhammad, mixed martial artist
- Dean Muhtadi, professional wrestler known as "Mojo Rawley"
- Muhammad Halim, American athlete
- Saad Awad, mixed martial artist
- Tarek Saleh, former NFL player
- Omar Sheika, boxer

=== Other ===
- Sami Al-Arian, former professor at University of South Florida, prominent civil rights activist, imprisoned & indicted on controversial charges, cleared then deported
- Nidal Malik Hasan, former soldier convicted of the 2009 Fort Hood shooting
- Palestina "Tina" Isa, honor killing victim, daughter of Palestinian American Zein Isa, her killer
- Tawfic Abdel Jabbar, teenager killed by the IDF while driving in the West Bank
- Mohammad Khdour, American-born teenager shot dead by an Israeli gunman outside Biddu
- Rasmea Odeh, convicted of immigration fraud, for concealing her arrest, conviction, and imprisonment for a fatal terrorist bombing
- Wadea al-Fayoume, six year old boy living in the Chicago metropolitan area who was murdered by his landlord in the wake of the Gaza war.
- Michael Tarazi, lawyer and advisor to the Palestine Liberation Organisation's negotiations team during the early 2000s.
- Ali "SypherPK" Hassan, YouTuber and Twitch streamer

== See also ==
- Palestinians
- Palestinian diaspora
- List of Palestinians
- List of Palestinian artists
