= The Halal Guys =

Fast casual restaurant franchise in Manhattan, New York

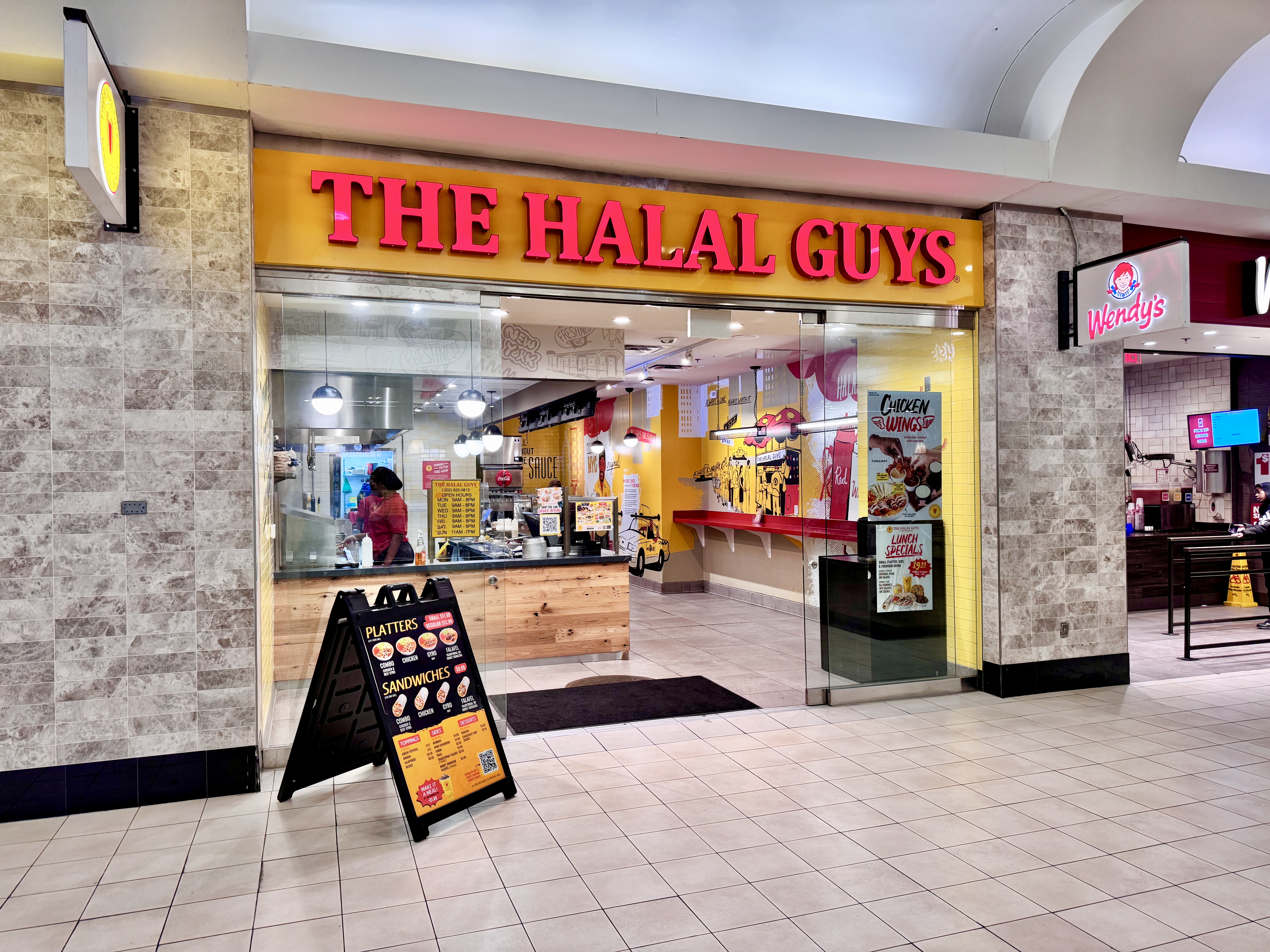
- The Halal Guys at Washington Union Station
- Interactive map of The Halal Guys

Restaurant information
- Established: 1990; 36 years ago
- Owners: Mohamed Abouelenein; Ahmed Elsaka; Abdelbaset Elsayed via The Halal Guys Franchise Inc.
- Food type: Middle Eastern cuisine
- Location: Corners of 53rd Street and Sixth Avenue (main and second locations), Manhattan, New York City, New York, 10019, United States
- Coordinates: 40°45′42″N 73°58′45″W
- Website: thehalalguys.com

The Halal Guys is an American fast-casual restaurant franchise that originated as a halal cart in Manhattan, New York City.

The franchise is most recognized by its primary dish which is a platter of chicken or gyro meat with rice, though it also serves a chicken or gyro wrap sandwich.

== History ==
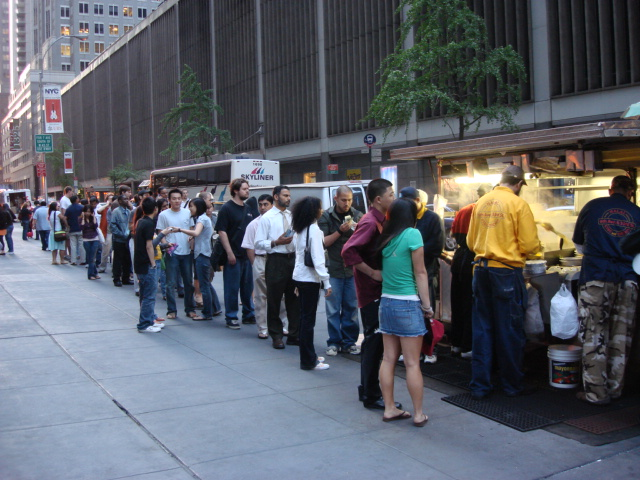
Line at the cart (2007)

The Halal Guys was founded in 1990 by Egyptian Americans Mohamed Abouelenein, Ahmed Elsaka, and Abdelbaset Elsayed as a hot dog cart located at the southeast corner of 53rd Street and Sixth Avenue. Abouelenein, however, believed that a hot dog was not a satisfying meal, and switched to the current menu of chicken, gyro meat, rice, and pita in 1992. As a result, New York City's Muslim cab drivers flocked to the cart for its ability to provide a quick, relatively inexpensive halal meal.

Food journalists have noted that the cart's rise paralleled broader transformations in New York City's street-food economy, where informal vendors increasingly shaped the city's public culinary identity.

The cart has caused a decline in the popularity of hot dog street vendors in New York City and has influenced many food trucks.

A cart called "New York's Best Halal Food" is also located on the southwest corner of 53rd Street and Sixth Avenue. It is unknown which cart was located at the intersection first.

On October 28, 2006, a fight that started in line ended with 23-year-old Ziad Tayeh stabbing and killing 19-year-old Tyrone Gibbons. The fight began after one accused the other of cutting in line. Tayeh was later found not guilty, as the jury found that he acted in self-defense. The New York Times once reported that the owners had hired bouncers.

The Halal Guys donated $30,000 to LaGuardia Community College in 2016, with the money funding scholarships for students experiencing financial hardships.

== Food ==
The Halal Guys serves "American halal" platters and sandwiches, prepared using ingredients such as chicken, gyro meat, falafel, and rice. The taste has been described as entailing a complex melting pot of flavors originating from the Mediterranean and Middle East. The Halal Guys also serve a white sauce condiment, often cited by patrons as a favorite and described as "famous". A "distant cousin of tzatziki", the Halal Guys' white sauce has been the subject of multiple recreations based on ingredients on to-go packets, but to no avail. A similar condiment is found at all or most other halal carts in New York City, but the recipe likely often varies from cart to cart. The Halal Guys also prepares a red hot sauce. The white sauce in particular has attracted widespread media attention, with food writers describing it as a “cult condiment” whose precise ingredients remain undisclosed.

== Franchising ==
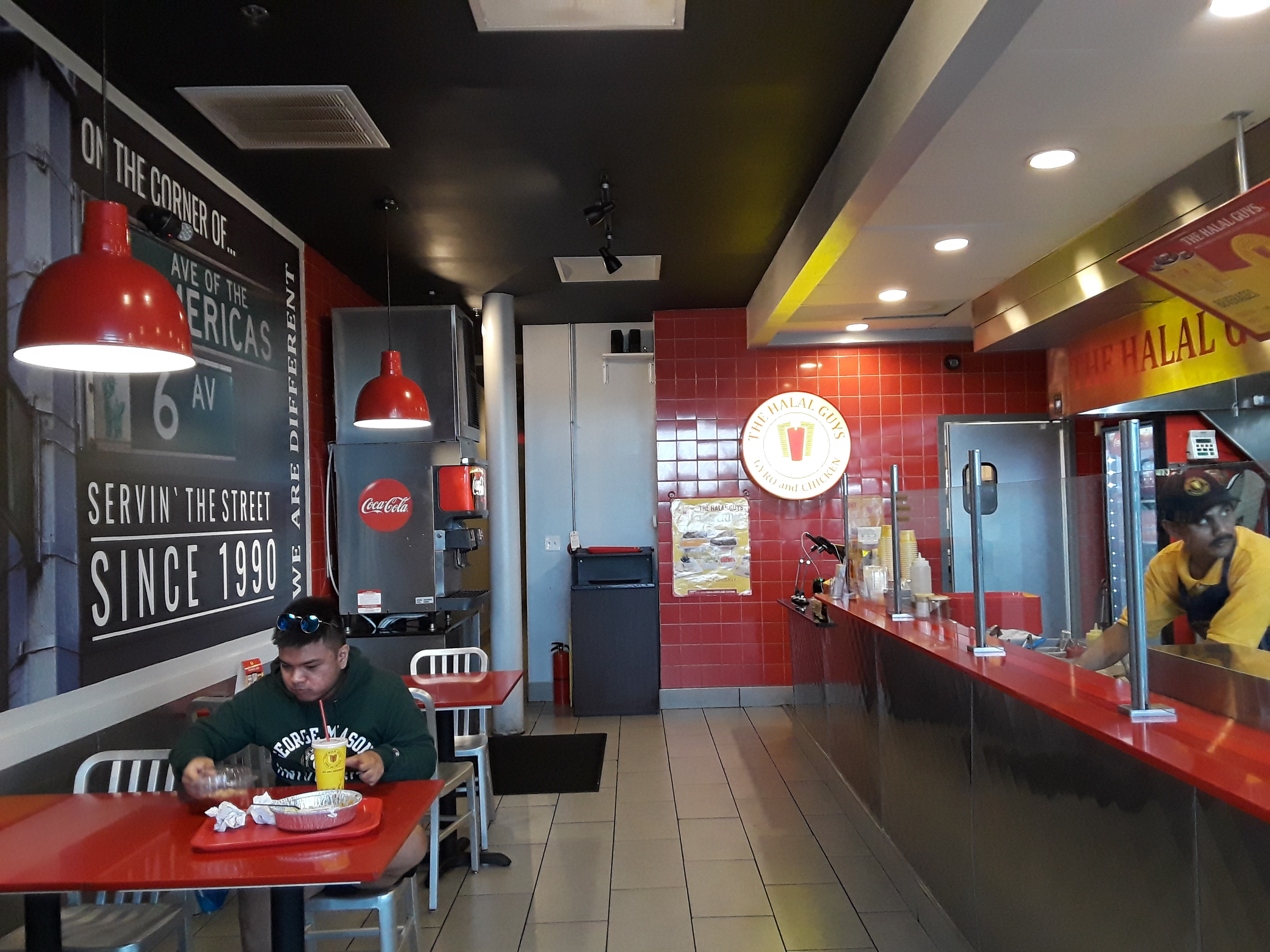
Interior of a franchise in Springfield, Virginia, in June 2018

In June 2014, Halal Guys hired Fransmart, a franchise development company that had previously worked with Qdoba Mexican Grill and Five Guys and had sold 350 franchises as of March 2016. Within the first year of launching their franchise expansion campaign they closed deals for California; New Jersey; Connecticut; Virginia; Washington, D.C.; Houston and Austin, Texas; Chicago, Illinois.

In 2015, Halal Guys opened their first international franchise in the Philippines. This franchise was the first restaurant to be halal certified by the Halal Development Institute of the Philippines, but is no longer listed as an active franchise on the official Halal Guys website. As of 2025, The Halal Guys operate over 100 locations globally, including franchises in the United States, Canada, South Korea, Indonesia, and the United Kingdom.

== Reception ==
In 2005, Chicken and Rice was one of four finalists for the "Vendy Award" presented by a New York City street vendor advocacy group known as the Street Vendor Project. Chicken and Rice eventually lost out to Rolf Babiel from Hallo Berlin, a sausage cart on 54th and 5th.

In addition, the popularity of the cart has been further aided by high-profile customers. Chef Christopher Lee, who was one of Food & Wine's best new chefs of 2006, mentioned in an interview with the magazine that he "can't stay away from it" and once was there on Christmas Eve waiting two and a half hours in the cold.

The cart has since become a prominent cuisine throughout New York City and has been heard as far as Hawaii. It has caused an increase in competition among street meat carts in Midtown Manhattan. Lines commonly grow to over an hour's wait. There is also a student club at New York University dedicated to the food cart.

The Halal Guys was awarded the 2014 Multicultural Award by the American Muslim Consumer Consortium for their promotion of diversity and multiculturalism and their inclusivity to all minorities in America.

== Cultural impact ==
The Halal Guys are widely credited with helping define what has been termed "American halal", a fusion style that blends Middle Eastern flavors with New York street food traditions. Their rise in the 1990s and early 2000s coincided with the expansion of Muslim immigrant communities in the city, and the cart became a gathering point for cab drivers, night-shift workers, and students seeking inexpensive halal meals. Food writers have noted that the cart helped shift New Yorkers' perceptions of halal food from a niche religious requirement to a mainstream culinary category.

The brand's white sauce has also entered popular culture. Publications such as Grub Street, Eater, and Thrillist have published articles attempting to recreate or decode the condiment, often referring to its recipe as "secret" or "mysterious". The sauce's popularity has contributed to broader interest in halal street food and has been replicated by many other halal carts across Manhattan.

People recognized the original 53rd Street cart for its long lines, which often went on for more than a block.

== Business model and operations ==
The Halal Guys’ business model has been widely discussed in industry analyses as an example of how street-vendor credibility can be transformed into a scalable fast-casual brand. The company emphasizes standardized training for franchise operators, aiming to replicate the original cart's flavor profile and service style across locations. Despite expansion, the company continues to reference its origins as a street cart, using imagery and branding that highlight its New York roots. Analysts have noted that the brand's success depends heavily on maintaining consistency in its signature sauces, portion sizes, and rice-to-protein ratio, which have become central to customer expectations. The company has also invested in supply-chain infrastructure to ensure halal certification standards are maintained internationally, reflecting ongoing demand for halal-certified products in both Muslim-majority and non-Muslim contexts.

== See also ==
- List of chicken restaurants
- List of restaurants in New York City
