= 2012 United States Senate election in Maryland =

- November 6, 2012
- Turnout: 68.2%
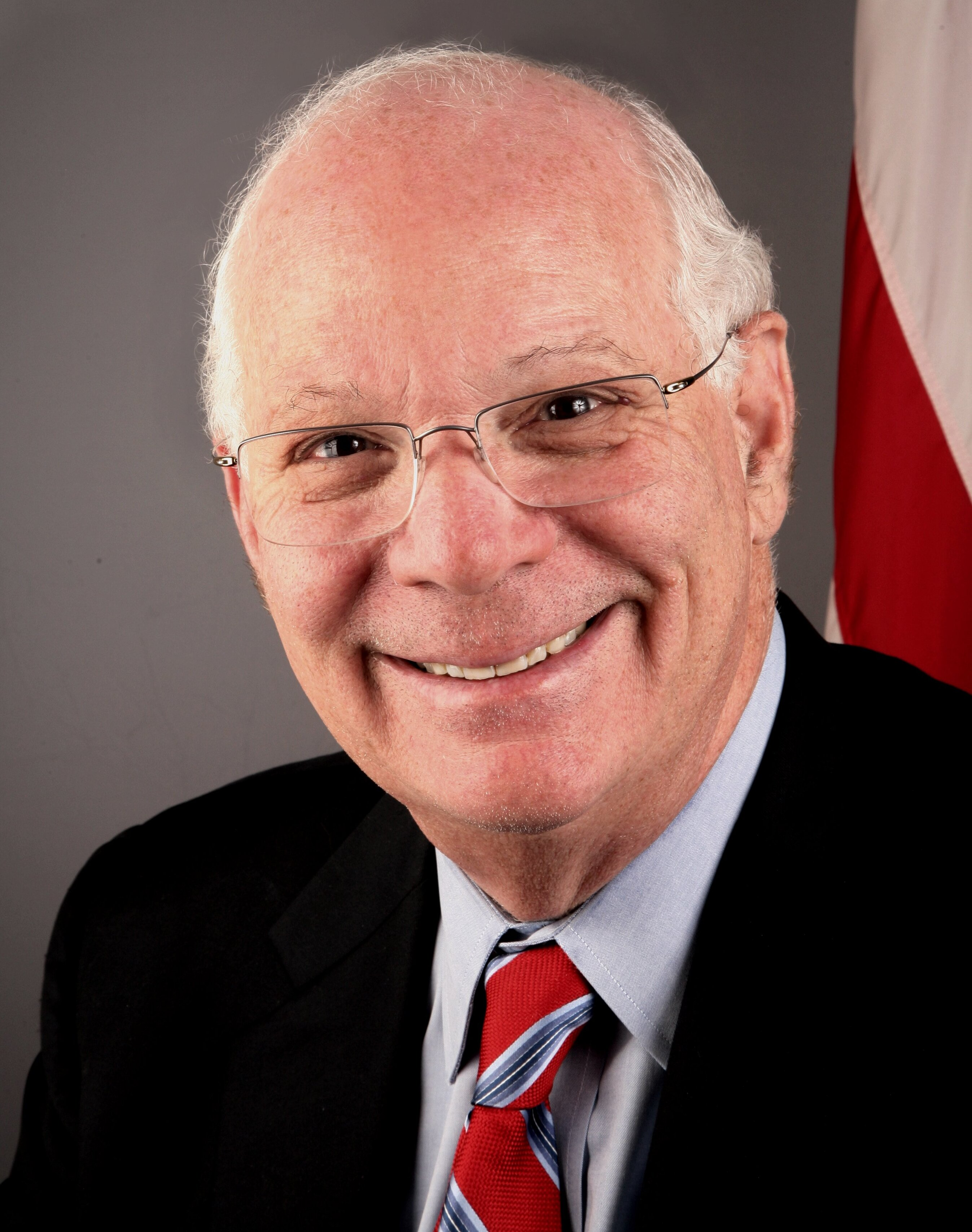

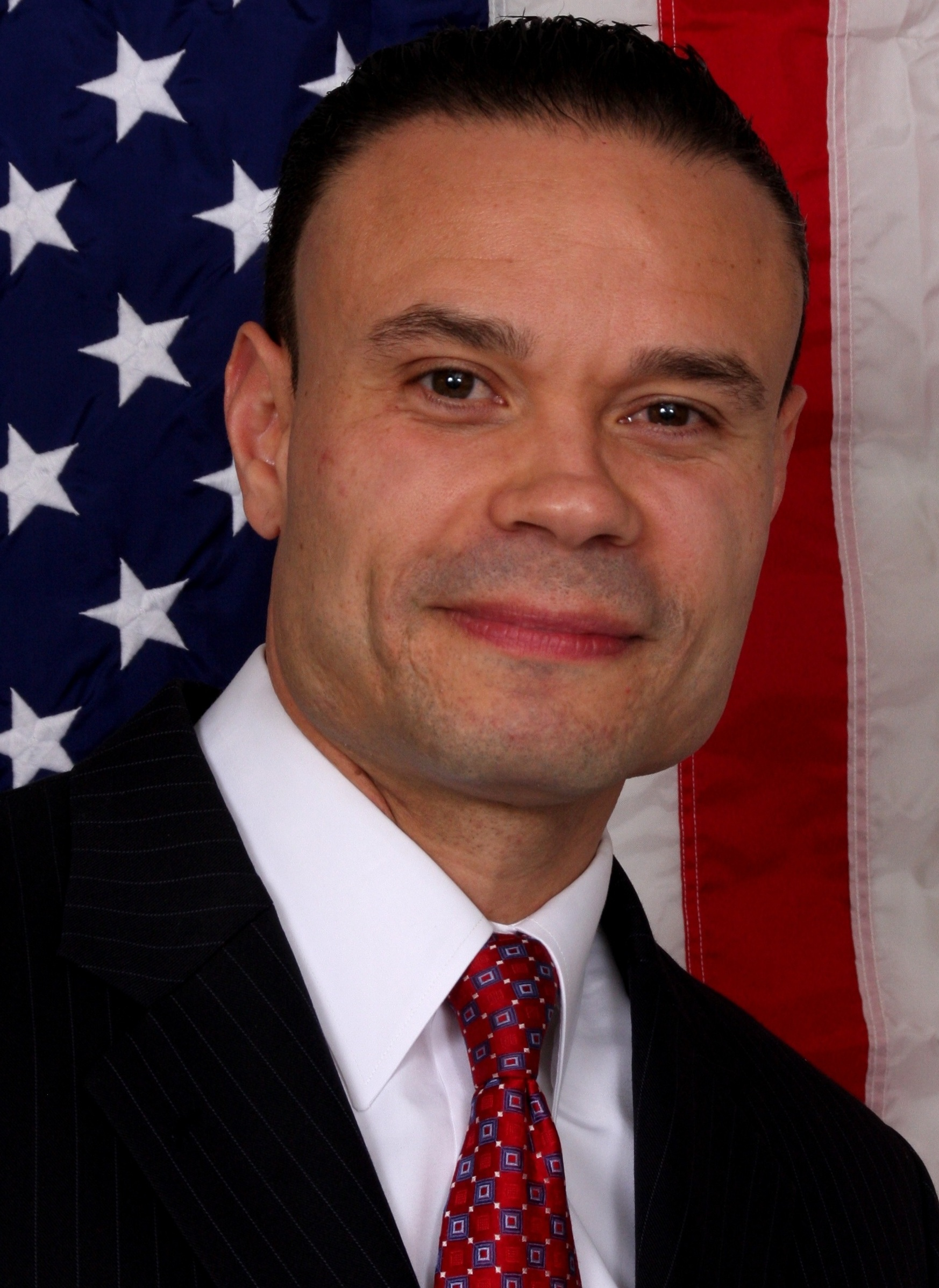

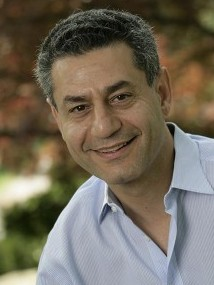
Nominee	Ben Cardin	Dan Bongino	Rob Sobhani
Party	Democratic	Republican	Independent
Popular vote	1,474,028	693,291	430,934
Percentage	55.98%	26.33%	16.37%
- Cardin: 30–40% 40–50% 50–60% 60–70% 70–80% 80–90% >90% Bongino: 30–40% 40–50% 50–60% 60–70% 70–80% Sobhani: 30–40% 40–50% Tie: 30–40% 40–50%
U.S. senator before election
Ben Cardin
Democratic
Elected U.S. Senator
Ben Cardin
Democratic

The 2012 United States Senate election in Maryland took place on November 6, 2012, concurrently with the 2012 U.S. presidential election,other elections to the United States Senate and House of Representatives, and various state and local elections. Incumbent Democratic U.S. Senator Ben Cardin won re-election to a second term, defeating Republican nominee Dan Bongino and independent Rob Sobhani.

== Democratic primary ==
=== Candidates ===
==== Declared ====
- Raymond Blagmon
- Ben Cardin, incumbent U.S. senator
- J.P. Cusick
- Christopher Garner, engineer and businessman
- Ralph Jaffe, former political science teacher
- C. Anthony Muse, state senator
- Blaine Taylor
- Ed Tinus
- Lih Young, perennial candidate

=== Results ===
Results by county: Cardin—80–90% Cardin—70–80% Cardin—60–70% Cardin—50–60%

Democratic primary results
Party	Candidate	Votes	%
Democratic	Ben Cardin (incumbent)	240,704	74.2
Democratic	C. Anthony Muse	50,807	15.7
Democratic	Chris Garner	9,274	2.9
Democratic	Raymond Levi Blagmon	5,909	1.8
Democratic	J. P. Cusick	4,778	1.5
Democratic	Blaine Taylor	4,376	1.3
Democratic	Lih Young	3,993	1.2
Democratic	Ralph Jaffe	3,313	1.0
Democratic	Ed Tinus	1,064	0.3
Total votes		324,218	100.0

== Republican primary ==
=== Candidates ===
==== Declared ====
- Joseph Alexander
- Dan Bongino, former United States Secret Service agent
- Bro Broadus
- William Capps
- Richard Douglas, attorney and former deputy assistant secretary of defense
- Rick Hoover
- David Jones
- John B. Kimble, behavioral scientist and perennial candidate
- Brian Vaeth, retired firefighter
- Corrogan R. Vaughn, perennial candidate

==== Declined ====
- Bob Ehrlich, former governor of Maryland and nominee for governor in 2010
- Brian Murphy, candidate for governor in 2010
- Eric Wargotz, nominee for the U.S. Senate in 2010

=== Results ===
Results by county: Bongino—40–50% Bongino—<40% Douglas—<40% Douglas—40–50%

Republican primary results
Party	Candidate	Votes	%
Republican	Dan Bongino	68,597	33.6
Republican	Richard J. Douglas	57,776	28.3
Republican	Joseph Alexander	18,171	8.9
Republican	Bro Broadus	11,020	5.4
Republican	Rick Hoover	10,787	5.3
Republican	John B. Kimble	10,506	5.1
Republican	David Jones	8,380	4.1
Republican	Corrogan R. Vaughn	8,158	4.0
Republican	William Thomas Capps, Jr.	7,092	3.5
Republican	Brian Vaeth	3,781	1.9
Total votes		204,268	100.0

== General election ==
=== Candidates ===
- Dean Ahmad (Libertarian), president of the Minaret of Freedom Institute
- Brandy Baker (Socialist, certified write-in)
- Daniel Bongino (Republican), former United States Secret Service agent
- Ben Cardin (Democratic), incumbent U.S. senator and former U.S. representative
- S. Rob Sobhani (independent), chairman and CEO of Caspian Group Holdings

=== Debates ===
A candidates' forum was held on Baltimore's WOLB radio on October 24, including Senator Ben Cardin, Rob Sobhani, Dean Ahmad and Daniel Bongino.

An October 30 debate at Salisbury University would have featured those candidates and independent Ed Tinus, but was cancelled in the aftermath of Hurricane Sandy.

=== Campaign ===
In 2006, then-U.S. Representative Ben Cardin defeated then-Lieutenant Governor Michael Steele 54%–44%. Eric Wargotz, the Republican nominee in 2010, had considered entering the race but ultimately did not.

In both 2009 and 2010, National Journal magazine rated Cardin as tied for most liberal senator, based on his voting record. As of June 30, Cardin had $1.8 million in his campaign account.

=== Fundraising ===
Candidate (party)	Receipts	Disbursements	Cash on hand	Debt
Ben Cardin (D)	$3,758,957	$2,248,013	$1,896,329	$0
Daniel Bongino (R)	$188,419	$172,509	$15,909	$0
Dean Ahmad (L)	$8,565	$6,288	$2,276	$0
S. Rob Sobhani (I)	$6,472,715	$6,043,030	$429,683	$0
Source: Federal Election Commission

==== Top contributors ====
Ben Cardin		Daniel Bongino	
Exelon Corp	$39,250	NORPAC	$21,730
News Corp	$35,375	Avjet Corp	$5,000
Johns Hopkins University	$30,300	Citizens United	$5,000
Comcast Corp	$26,123	Oheka Castle	$5,000
Ernst & Young	$26,000	Miller & Long Concrete Construction	$4,891
Gallagher, Evelius & Jones	$24,250	Perinatal Center of Oklahoma	$4,790
Venable LLP	$23,750	NYPD	$3,950
DLA Piper	$23,250	Fitzgerald Shamrock Restaurant	$3,947
DaVita Inc.	$22,000	Davidsonville Veterinary Clinic	$3,250
Blue Cross & Blue Shield	$20,750	Constitutional Conservatives Fund	$2,500

==== Top industries ====
Ben Cardin		Daniel Bongino	
Lawyers/law firms	$441,242	Retired	$20,152
Real estate	$354,920	General contractors	$8,641
Health professionals	$317,509	Civil servants/public officials	$8,135
Financial institutions	$301,161	Health professionals	$6,540
Pro-Israel	$236,792	Real estate	$5,700
Retired	$222,410	Republican/Conservative	$5,500
Lobbyists	$213,559	Lodging/tourism	$5,000
Insurance	$191,300	Computers/Internet	$4,110
Leadership PACs	$191,000	Food industry & beverage	$3,947
Entertainment industry	$188,806	Financial institutions	$3,800

=== Predictions ===
Source	Ranking	As of
The Cook Political Report	Solid D	November 1, 2012
Sabato's Crystal Ball	Safe D	November 5, 2012
Rothenberg Political Report	Safe D	November 2, 2012
Real Clear Politics	Safe D	November 5, 2012

=== Polling ===
Poll source	Date(s) administered	Sample size	Margin of error	Ben Cardin (D)	Daniel Bongino (R)	Rob Sobhani (I)	Other	Undecided
Gonzales Research & Marketing Strategies	September 17–23, 2012	813	±3.5%	50%	22%	21%	—	7%
The Washington Post	October 11–15, 2012	843	±4%	53%	22%	14%	2%	9%
OpinionWorks	October 20–23, 2012	801	±3.5%	50%	24%	14%	2%	10%

Hypothetical polling

Poll source	Date(s) administered	Sample size	Margin of error	Ben Cardin (D)	Generic Republican	Other	Undecided
Public Policy Polling	July 10–12, 2010	569	±4.1%	51%	33%	—	16%

Poll source	Date(s) administered	Sample size	Margin of error	Ben Cardin (D)	Michael Steele (R)	Other	Undecided
Public Policy Polling	July 10–12, 2010	569	±4.1%	58%	28%	—	14%

=== Results ===

2012 United States Senate election in Maryland
Party	Candidate	Votes	%	±%
Democratic	Ben Cardin (incumbent)	1,474,028	55.98%	+1.77%
Republican	Dan Bongino	693,291	26.33%	−17.86%
Independent	Rob Sobhani	430,934	16.37%	N/A
Libertarian	Dean Ahmad	32,252	1.22%	N/A
Write-in		2,729	0.10%	+0.05%
Total votes		2,633,234	100.00%	N/A
Democratic hold				

==== By county ====
County	Ben Cardin Democratic		Dan Bongino Republican		Rob Sobhani Independent		Dean Ahmad Libertarian		Other Other		Margin		Total votes cast
County	#	%	#	%	#	%	#	%	#	%	#	%	Total votes cast
Allegany	9507	33.38%	14667	51.50%	3920	14.60%	367	1.29%	18	0.06%	-5160	-18.12%	28479
Anne Arundel	108328	42.62%	93804	36.90%	48503	19.08%	3320	1.31%	241	0.09%	14524	5.71%	254196
Baltimore	198290	52.55%	95297	25.25%	78887	20.91%	4434	1.18%	439	0.12%	102993	27.29%	377347
Baltimore City	189128	77.21%	16931	6.91%	35724	14.58%	2930	1.20%	232	0.09%	172197	62.63% (Note: Compares margin over Sobhani.)	244945
Calvert	17296	39.36%	17272	39.31%	8806	20.04%	523	1.19%	43	0.10%	24	0.05%	43940
Caroline	4423	33.93%	5898	45.24%	2575	19.75%	122	0.94%	18	0.14%	-1475	-11.31%	13036
Carroll	22837	26.69%	41795	48.86%	19733	23.07%	1118	1.31%	66	0.08%	-18958	-22.16%	85549
Cecil	14994	36.41%	18452	44.81%	7137	17.33%	549	1.33%	47	0.11%	-3458	-8.40%	41179
Charles	42638	58.24%	16752	22.88%	13036	17.81%	721	0.98%	58	0.08%	25886	35.36%	73205
Dorchester	6552	44.29%	5526	37.36%	2567	17.35%	132	0.89%	16	0.11%	1026	6.94%	14793
Frederick	45161	39.80%	48563	42.80%	17913	15.79%	1720	1.52%	112	0.10%	-3402	-3.00%	113469
Garrett	3448	27.87%	8263	66.79%	492	3.98%	163	1.32%	6	0.05%	-4815	-38.92%	12372
Harford	43274	35.04%	45404	36.77%	33148	26.84%	1535	1.24%	126	0.10%	-2130	-1.72%	123487
Howard	80265	53.66%	42892	28.67%	23815	15.92%	2462	1.65%	148	0.10%	37373	24.98%	149582
Kent	4312	44.45%	3608	37.20%	1660	17.11%	88	0.91%	32	0.33%	704	7.26%	9700
Montgomery	293715	66.21%	94010	21.19%	49611	11.18%	5790	1.31%	455	0.10%	199705	45.02%	443581
Prince George's	305771	81.40%	25080	6.68%	40937	10.90%	3521	0.94%	339	0.09%	280691	70.50%	375648
Queen Anne's	7385	30.13%	12540	51.15%	4344	17.72%	217	0.89%	28	0.11%	-5155	-21.03%	24514
St. Mary's	17566	38.29%	19480	42.46%	8065	17.58%	723	1.58%	42	0.09%	-1914	-4.17%	45876
Somerset	4686	46.70%	3568	35.56%	1682	16.76%	86	0.86%	13	0.13%	1118	11.14%	10035
Talbot	8100	40.46%	8986	44.89%	2729	13.63%	173	0.86%	32	0.16%	-886	-4.43%	20020
Washington	19702	32.56%	28161	46.53%	11788	19.48%	824	1.36%	41	0.07%	-8459	-13.98%	60516
Wicomico	16974	41.41%	15072	36.77%	8426	20.56%	452	1.10%	63	0.15%	1902	4.64%	40987
Worcester	9676	36.21%	11270	42.18%	5436	20.34%	282	1.06%	56	0.21%	-1594	-5.97%	26720
Total	1474028	55.98%	693291	26.33%	430934	16.37%	32252	1.22%	2729	0.10%	780737	28.90%	2633234

Counties that flipped from Republican to Democratic

- Anne Arundel (largest municipality: Annapolis)
- Calvert (largest municipality: Chesapeake Beach)
- Dorchester (largest municipality: Cambridge)
- Kent (largest municipality: Chestertown)
- Somerset (largest municipality: Princess Anne)
- Wicomico (largest municipality: Salisbury)

== See also ==
- 2012 United States Senate elections
- 2012 United States elections
