= Said Durrah =

American comedian

- Born: February 9, 1982 (age 44); Detroit, Michigan, United States

Comedy career
- Years active: 2009–present
- Medium: Stand-up
- Genres: Observational comedy, Satire
- Subjects: Arab culture, Religion, Political satire, Stereotypes
- Website: www.saidsworld.com

Said Durrah (Arabic: سعيد درة; born February 9, 1982) is an American stand-up comedian of Arab descent.

== Early life ==
Durrah is of Jordanian and Palestinian descent. His father, Hisham Durrah, is from Amman, Jordan, and mother, Hiyam Durrah, is from Gaza, Palestine.

He was born in Detroit, Michigan, United States and he grew up in Mayo, Maryland, United States. He attended South River Senior and then studied General Business Administration at University of Maryland University College.

== Career ==
Durrah worked in corporate marketing, travel agents and banking, before he focused entirely on comedy in 2009.

In October 2009, Durrah first hit the stage at Big Brown Comedy Hour in New York. He then got his start in Manhattan, New York, at Comic Strip Live. He then performed at the Town Hall Theatre on Broadway within his first year in comedy. Durrah has performed stand up comedy in a number of venues all over the United States.

In October and November 2010, he toured with other Muslim comedians on the "Arabs Gone Wild" tour. In 2011 and 2012, Durrah performed at the New York Arab American Comedy Festival at Gotham Comedy Club.

From February 2013, Durrah will be touring with his show "Arab Is Me".

Durrah also produces comedy shows.

== Comedy style ==
Durrah's comedy career is influenced by his parents and their Arab roots. His comedy has been described as an experience of off the wall energy in which he uses different voices, storytelling, impersonations, and crazy facial expressions.

== See also ==
- Humour in Islam
- Jordanian Americans
- Palestinian Americans
- List of Palestinian Americans
