= Imad-ad-Dean Ahmad =

Palestinian-American scholar

- عماد الدين أحمد
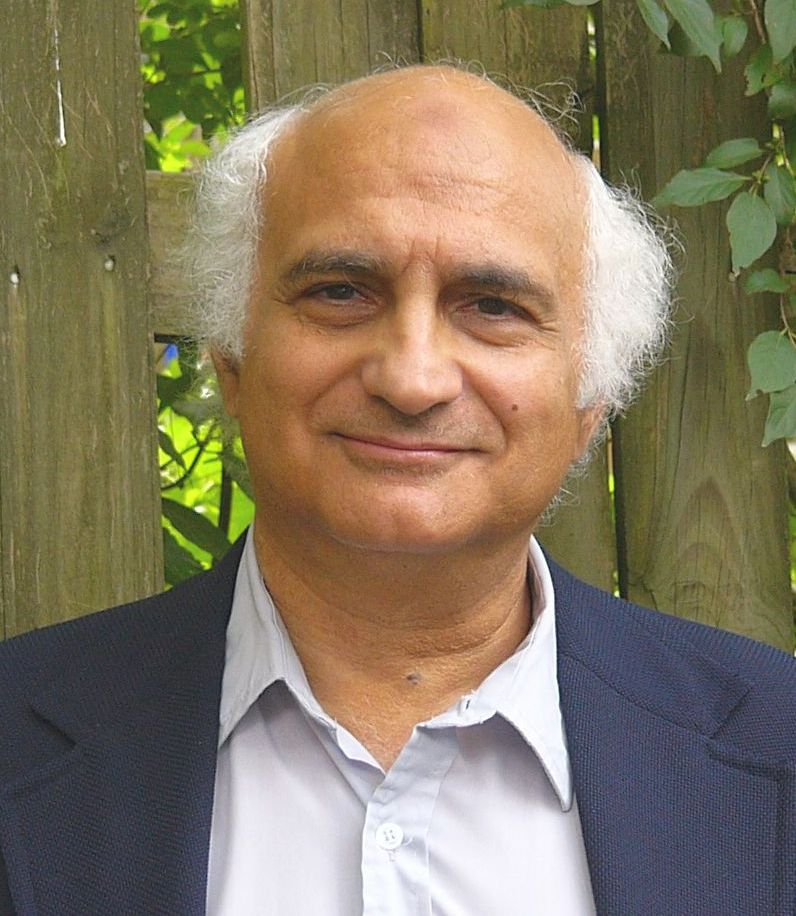
- Imad-ad-Dean Ahmad in 2012
- Born: August 11, 1948 (age 78)
- Other name: Dean Ahmad

Academic background
- Education: Harvard University (BA, 1970); University of Arizona (PhD, 1975)
- Website: https://imadaddean.com/

Imad-ad-Dean Ahmad (also known as Dean Ahmad) (Arabic: عماد الدين أحمد) (born August 11, 1948) is a Palestinian American scholar and the president of the Minaret of Freedom Institute, a libertarian 501(c)(3) tax-exempt think-tank. He also is president of the Islamic-American Zakat Foundation, a 501(c)(3) tax-exempt religious and charitable organization that primarily serves poor and needy Muslims in the United States.

== Biography ==
Ahmad was born on the way to the United States when his family left Palestine in 1948. He was raised in Pennsylvania and graduated cum laude with a bachelor's degree from Harvard University (1970) and a doctoral degree in astronomy and astrophysics from the University of Arizona (1975). He is a Muslim.

== Academic career ==
Ahmad taught an introductory course on Islam at Wesley Theological Seminary. He also has taught courses on religion, science and freedom at the University of Maryland, College Park. and courses relating to Islam and development at Georgetown University, the Johns Hopkins University, School for Advanced International Studies, and the Prince Alwaleed Center for Muslim–Christian Understanding.

Ahmad has written and spoken on Islam and legal and religious freedom, democracy in the Muslim world, Islamic civil society, property rights in Islam, women in Islam and female circumcision, Middle East conflicts in Palestine and Iraq, Palestinian human and property rights, terrorism and jihad, and American civil liberties. Ahmad is the author of Signs in the Heavens: A Muslim Astronomer's Perspective on Religion and Science and Islamic Rules of Order, co-editor of Islam and the West: A Dialog, and co-author of Islam and the Discovery of Freedom. He also contributed to The Encyclopedia of Libertarianism with an article on Islam. His address on "Islam, Commerce and Business Ethics" was published in Nicholas Capaldi's Business and Religion: A Clash of Civilizations? He has been published by Middle East Policy, American Muslim Magazine, Economic Affairs and Georgetown Journal of International Affairs. Ahmad has been a frequent guest lecturer at the Foreign Services Institute.

Ahmad was a Muslim chaplain at American University, the Islamic chaplain at the Clifton T. Perkins Hospital, Imam of the Dar-adh-Dhikr Mosque and arbitrator for the Coordinating Council of Muslim Organizations in the Greater Washington Metropolitan Area. In 1998, in his role as the American Muslim Council Liaison to the Coalition for Free Exercise of Religion, he testified before the United States Senate Judiciary Subcommittee on the Constitution, Civil Rights and Human Rights, supporting the need for federal protection of religious freedom after the City of Boerne v. Flores case decided by the United States Supreme Court. Ahmad also is a spokesperson for the National Coalition for the Protection of Civil Liberties, a national coalition of over 20 Muslim and civil liberties organizations.

== Political activism ==
Ahmad has been an outspoken critic of the role of neoconservatives in shaping United States' foreign policy, especially in the Middle East.

In 2001 Ahmad joined a delegation of American Muslims participating in the "First Conference on Jerusalem" in Beirut, which was "dedicated to the liberation of Jerusalem."

Ahmad has been a libertarian activist since 1975, serving as chair of the Libertarian Party of Maryland, managing four political campaigns, and participating in various Libertarian Party of Maryland political activities He was a member of Academics for Ron Paul during congressman Paul's run for the 2008 presidential nomination.

He also has been active in the national Libertarian Party activities, serving as its national secretary, chair of its Judicial Committee, chair of its platform committee, and chair of the Muslim Outreach Committee of the Michael Badnarik for President Campaign in 2004.

In 1988 Ahmad ran as a Libertarian for the United States Senate even though only Republicans and Democrats were allowed to have their name printed unless they collected tens of thousands of signatures. Ahmad's court challenge to the law failed, but he received 500 write-in votes. Maryland law subsequently allowed the Libertarian Party to collect just 10,000 signatures to obtain ballot status.

== 2012 United States Senate campaign ==
In May 2012 the Libertarian Party of Maryland nominated Ahmad as its 2012 Senate candidate. After a successful legal battle for ballot status, he ran against Democratic incumbent Ben Cardin, Republican Dan Bongino, and independent Rob Sobhani. Ahmad's platform issues included bringing U.S. troops home, restoring civil liberties compromised by the "war on terror," working for federal government fiscal responsibility, and ending corporate welfare.

Ahmad was endorsed by former Governor Gary Johnson, Libertarian Party candidate for President of the United States. Johnson wrote "Dr. Ahmad is a strong consistent voice calling for individual Liberty for ALL Americans. His record of success as a civic activist for decades proves that Dr. Dean Ahmad is the kind of U.S. Senator this nation truly needs." Ahmad also endorsed Johnson.

Ahmad participated in the October 24, 2012 WOLB Radio debate. Montgomery County Media aired his statement on his candidacy. Ahmad raised $15,705 to fund his campaign. He received 32,252 votes, 1.2 percent of the total.

== Awards ==
Ahmad, a former President of both the East Bethesda Citizens Association and the Montgomery County Civic Federation, has received the "Star Cup for Outstanding Public Service" award from the Montgomery County Civic Federation, the "Champion of Democracy Award" from Marylanders for Democracy and the "Sentinel Award" from the Montgomery County Civic Federation. In 2012 Ahmad was one of several Arab-Americans recognized in a city of Gaithersburg award ceremony. In 1990 he received the Libertarian Party of Maryland's "Samuel P. Chase award, named after the Maryland signer of the Declaration of Independence.

== See also ==
- List of Arab Americans
- List of Palestinian Americans
