= Fares Zeideia =

Palestinian-American restaurateur (born 1966)

Fares "Freddy" Zeideia
- Born: 1966 (age 59–60); Ramallah, West Bank, Palestine
- Occupations: Restaurateur, street food vendor
- Years active: 2002–present
- Known for: Owner of King of Falafel and Shawarma
- Spouse: Married
- Children: 3

Fares "Freddy" Zeideia (born 1966) is a Palestinian-American restaurateur and owner of King of Falafel and Shawarma, a Middle Eastern food business based in Astoria, Queens, New York City.

== Early life ==
Fares Zeideia was born in 1966 in Ramallah, on the West Bank, Palestine, the eldest of six children. He immigrated to the United States at the age of 15, settling in Woodside, Queens, with relatives. Zeideia learned English while working various jobs; during this time he earned the nickname "Freddy" from one of his employers, who found "Fares" difficult to pronounce.

Growing up, Zeideia learned traditional Palestinian recipes from his mother, which later inspired his culinary career.

== Career ==
In April 2002 Zeideia launched his first food truck, King of Falafel and Shawarma at the corner of Broadway and 30th Street in Astoria, Queens. The menu was based on Zeideia's family recipes and featured an oval-shaped falafel, marinated grilled chicken, and beef and lamb shawarma served on homemade pita bread. The venture proved to be successful and in 2010, Zeideia won the Vendy Award for Best Street Food in New York. Zeideia opened several additional food trucks and in 2016, opened a brick-and-mortar restaurant at 30-15 Broadway when construction disrupted his original cart location. Zeideia briefly considered selling the business in July 2022, citing exhaustion and a desire to travel, but reconsidered the decision after receiving an outpouring of support from customers and his granddaughter’s influence. In 2024 Zeideia opened a brick-and-mortar location in Chicago Ridge, Illinois, his first location outside of New York. He also expressed an interest in further expanding the chain in Chicago and also opening a location in Dallas, Texas.

The King of Falafel and Shawarma has received notice in the media for the unique shape of the falafel and authenticity of the food.

== Personal life ==
Zeideia lives in East Elmhurst, Queens, with his wife of over 30 years. They have three children and six grandchildren. He identifies as a supporter of Palestine and has incorporated "Free Palestine" branding into his business.
