= Kelvin Natural Slush Co. =

American food truck company

- Industry: Food service
- Founded: New York, United States (2010; 16 years ago)
- Founder: Alex Rein, Zack Silverman
- Website: kelvinslush.com

Kelvin Natural Slush Co. is a New York-based food truck company specializing in slush drinks.

== History ==
The company was started by Zack Silverman and Alex Rein. The business was named after the Kelvin temperature scale. Their success has led to their slushes being sold at Madison Square Garden and at selected Whole Foods Market stores.

== Awards ==
The company was awarded "Best Dessert Truck" by the Vendy Awards.

== See also ==
- List of food trucks
