= Dan Bongino =

American podcaster (born 1974)

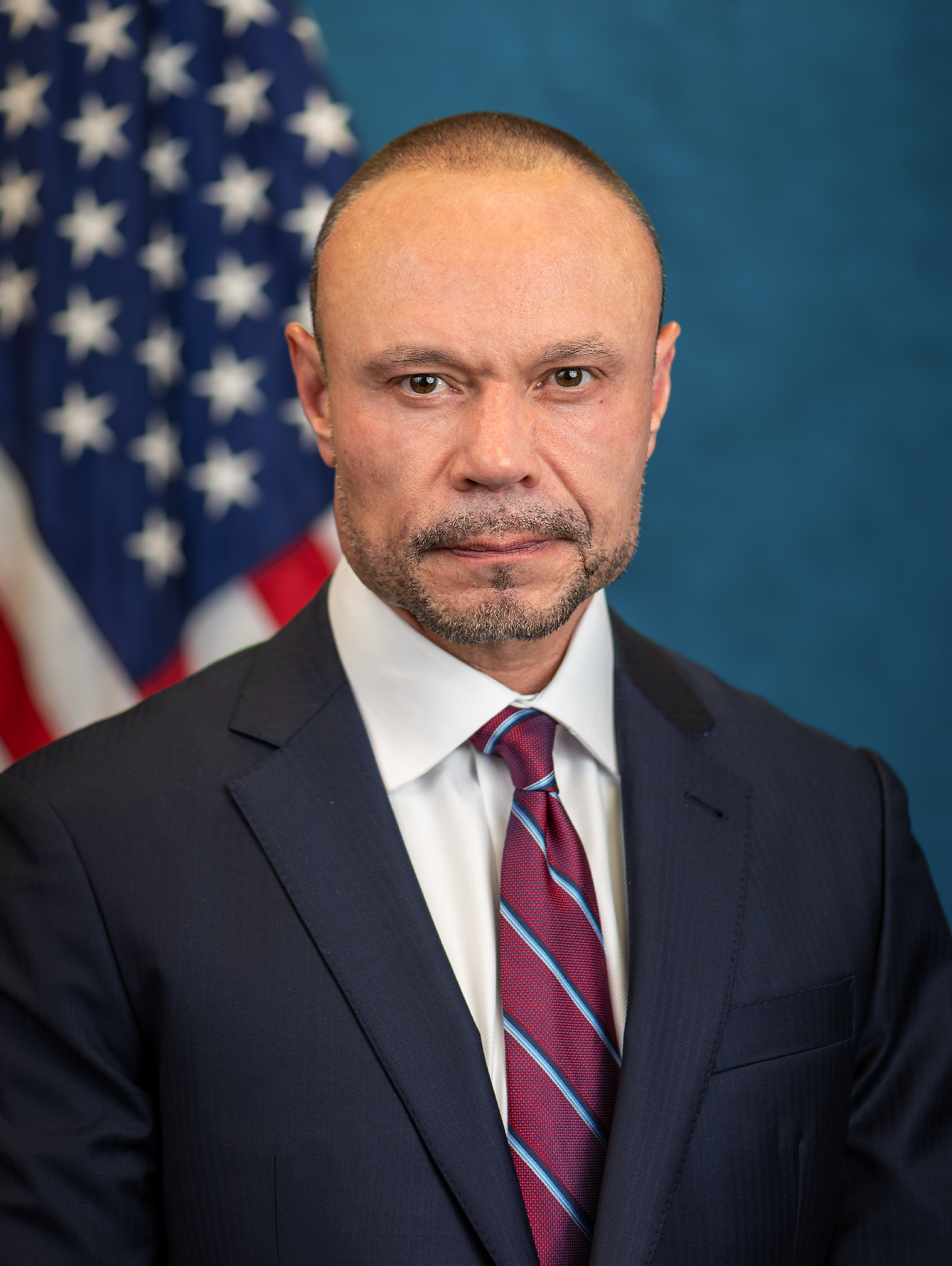
- Official portrait, 2025

20th Deputy Director of the Federal Bureau of Investigation
- In office March 17, 2025 – January 3, 2026; Served with Andrew Bailey
- President: Donald Trump
- Director: Kash Patel
- Preceded by: Paul Abbate
- Succeeded by: Christopher Raia

Personal details
- Born: Daniel John Bongino; December 4, 1974 (age 51) New York City, U.S.
- Party: Republican
- Spouse: Paula Martinez
- Children: 2
- Education: Queens College (BS, MS); Pennsylvania State University (MBA)
- Website: bongino.com
- Police career
- Service: New York Police Department; United States Secret Service
- Divisions: Presidential Protection Division
- Field offices: New York Field Office; James J. Rowley Training Center
- Service years: 1995–1999 (NYPD); 1999–2011 (Secret Service)
- Rank: Special agent

Daniel John Bongino (/bɒndʒiːnoʊ/ bon-JEE-noh; born December 4, 1974) is an American conservative podcaster, radio host, and former law enforcement officer who served as the 20th deputy director of the Federal Bureau of Investigation (FBI) from 2025 to 2026 (Note: About 10 months). He hosted The Dan Bongino Show on Rumble and previously hosted Unfiltered with Dan Bongino on Fox News until 2023.

Bongino began his career as a New York City Police Department (NYPD) officer from 1995 to 1999 before serving as a U.S. Secret Service agent from 1999 to 2011. He later unsuccessfully ran for Congress three times as a Republican. On February 23, 2025, President Donald Trump announced that Bongino had been named the next deputy director of the FBI. He assumed office on March 17, after concluding his commentating roles on March 14.

On December 17, 2025, Bongino announced on Twitter that he would leave his post in January 2026; he officially left his position on January 3.

== Early life and education ==
Daniel John Bongino was born and raised in Queens, New York City. He is of Italian descent. He grew up in Jackson Heights, Queens.

He graduated from Archbishop Molloy High School, a Catholic all-male high school in Jamaica, Queens, in 1992. He attended Queens College, earning bachelor's and master's degrees in psychology. He also earned a Master of Business Administration degree from Pennsylvania State University.

== Secret Service and law enforcement career (1995–2011) ==
Bongino worked as a police officer for the New York City Police Department from 1995 to 1999.

Bongino joined the United States Secret Service in 1999 as a special agent. In 2002 he left the New York Field Office to become an instructor at the Secret Service Training Academy in Beltsville, Maryland. In 2006, he was assigned to the Presidential Protection Division during George W. Bush's second term. He remained on protective duty after Barack Obama became president, leaving in May 2011 to run for the U.S. Senate.

Also in 2011, The Baltimore Sun reported that Bongino was the lead investigator of a car rental fraud scheme. His work contributed to two people being indicted on federal wire fraud charges.

Bongino was criticized by former colleagues at the Secret Service for using his Secret Service background as part of his run for political office and for his claim of having secret information based on conversations he overheard in the Obama White House. A former colleague accused him of "trying to draw attention to himself and...hijacking the Secret Service brand." Bongino said he had access to "high-level discussions" in the White House.

Bongino rejected birtherism, the claim that President Obama was born outside the United States.

== Media career ==
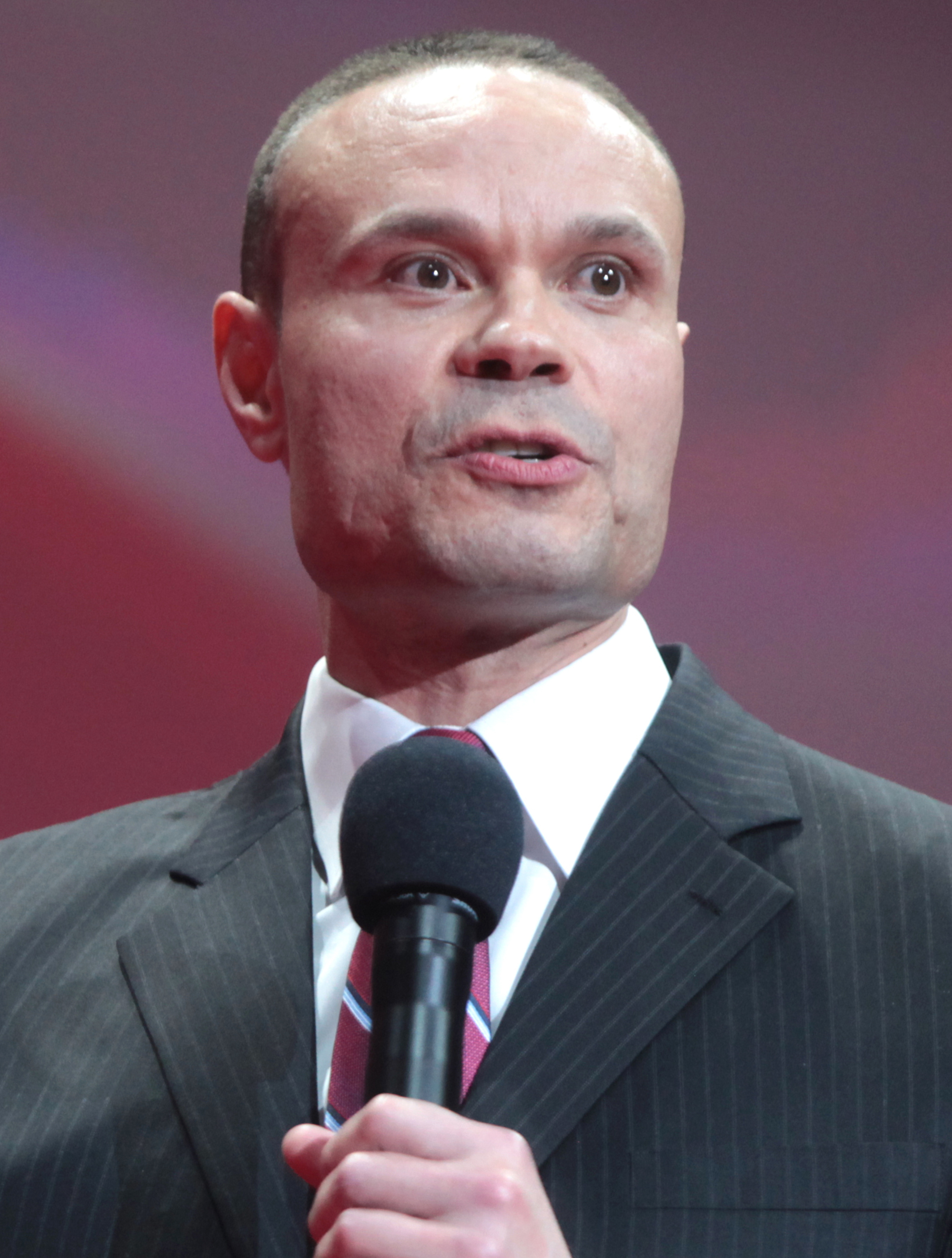
Bongino in 2016

Bongino has been a radio host and commentator on both local and national programs. He has guest-hosted The Sean Hannity Show and The Mark Levin Show and has filled in on WMAL-FM in Washington, D.C., and WBAL in Baltimore. He was a paid contributor to NRATV until December 2018. He also guest-hosted Hannity on Fox News in December 2018.

In December 2019, Bongino launched the Bongino Report as an alternative to the Drudge Report. He criticized the Drudge Report's founder, Matt Drudge, for allegedly shifting away from supporting Donald Trump.

In October 2020, Politico reported that Bongino's posts on Facebook were routinely among the most shared on the platform.

Following the January 6 United States Capitol attack, Bongino's Twitter account was temporarily suspended on January 7 for violating the platform's civic integrity policy. On his podcast, he argued that political violence had been normalized by leftist movements and accused liberal media outlets of hypocrisy in their coverage of protests.

In March 2021, Westwood One signed Bongino to replace The Rush Limbaugh Show on its talk radio stations while continuing to carry his one-hour podcast. In May of that year, Fox News announced he would host Unfiltered with Dan Bongino, which premiered on June 5. Between July and August 2021, he hosted Canceled in the USA, a five-part Fox Nation series on cancel culture. Talkers Magazine estimated his radio show had 8.5 million listeners as of October 2021, ranking second among programs competing to succeed Rush Limbaugh.

On October 19, 2021, Bongino said that he opposed corporate COVID-19 vaccine mandates, although he said he was vaccinated. He called on Westwood One parent company Cumulus Media to end their COVID-19 vaccine mandate, which had been announced in September. Unvaccinated employees at Cumulus had already been fired on October 11 and replaced. "You can have me or the mandate. But you can't have both of us", Bongino said on his show. After taking nearly two weeks off, he returned to announce he was negotiating his ultimatum with Cumulus, and starting a fund for former employees of Cumulus fired because of the vaccination mandate. Brian Rosenwald, a talk radio historian, believed Bongino's request was never much of an ultimatum, seeing little reason for Cumulus or its host to sever ties. Rosenwald commented:

I think it was a cynical ploy, to some extent. There was an incentive for him to stay with them because of that platform, and they've invested a lot of money in launching this show and building it up.

In a December 2021 interview with The New Yorker, Bongino stated that he had been vaccinated for COVID-19 at the advice of his doctor due to his lymphoma.

In January 2022, YouTube permanently banned Bongino for attempting to circumvent a temporary suspension related to a video questioning the efficacy of masks during the COVID-19 pandemic. Prior to the ban, he had already moved his podcast to Rumble.

On April 20, 2023, Bongino announced his departure from Fox News, citing failed contract negotiations.

On December 11, 2022, Bongino announced plans to end his radio show at the conclusion of his contract. Cumulus began phasing his show out of its stations' lineups in June 2023. However, in December 2023, he reversed course, securing a multi-year contract extension with Westwood One. Upon Bongino's acceptance of a position as deputy director of the FBI in 2025, Westwood One replaced Bongino with Vince Coglianese, a personality based at WMAL-FM.

After his resignation from the Trump administration in January 2026, Bongino revived The Dan Bongino Show podcast on Rumble.

Westwood One announced in August 2026 that they had rehired Bongino, and that he would begin hosting the new drive time show The Bongino Report PM beginning August 24. The "PM" suffix reflects that Bongino was also tapped to launch The Bongino Report AM as an early-morning show beginning on September 21, 2026, which will replace its existing newsmagazine America in the Morning.

== Political aspirations ==
=== 2012 U.S. Senate election ===
Bongino ran unsuccessfully for the U.S. Senate in Maryland in 2012. Former gubernatorial candidate Brian Murphy was his campaign chairman. Bongino won the Republican primary on April 3, 2012, with 33.8 percent of the vote, defeating nine other candidates. He lost the general election in a landslide, taking only 26.6% of the vote against incumbent Democrat Ben Cardin in a three-way election battle.

=== 2014 House of Representatives election ===
In the 2014 election, Bongino ran for the U.S. House seat in Maryland's 6th congressional district against incumbent Democrat John Delaney. Bongino narrowly lost to Delaney by 1.5 percentage points. Although Bongino carried four of the district's five counties, he ran a 20,500-vote deficit in the district's share of Montgomery County in the outer suburbs of Washington.

=== 2016 House of Representatives election ===
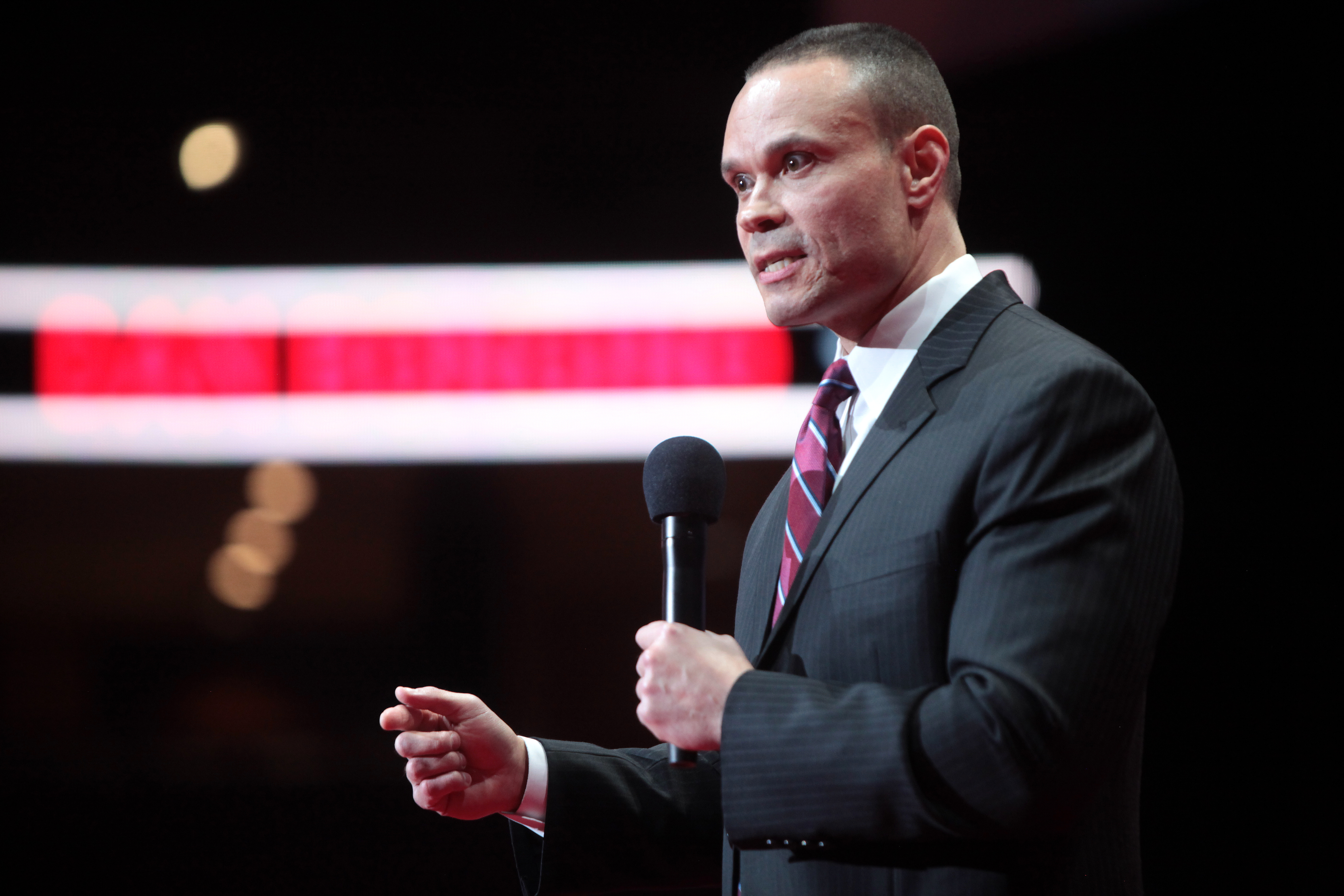
Bongino speaking at an event in February 2016

After moving to Florida in 2015, Bongino contemplated running for the United States Senate and Florida's 18th congressional district in 2016. However, in June 2016, Bongino declared that he would seek the Republican nomination for Florida's 19th congressional district. He faced Chauncey Goss, a Sanibel city councilman who sought the seat in 2012, and Francis Rooney, a businessman and former United States ambassador to the Holy See, in the primary.

In an August 2016 interview with a Politico reporter, Bongino went on a profanity-laced rant against a reporter who asked about a story in the Naples Daily News that Bongino said was dishonest. The recorded phone call was published by Politico. He placed third in the August 2016 primary, losing the nomination to Rooney.

== Deputy Director of the FBI (2025–2026) ==
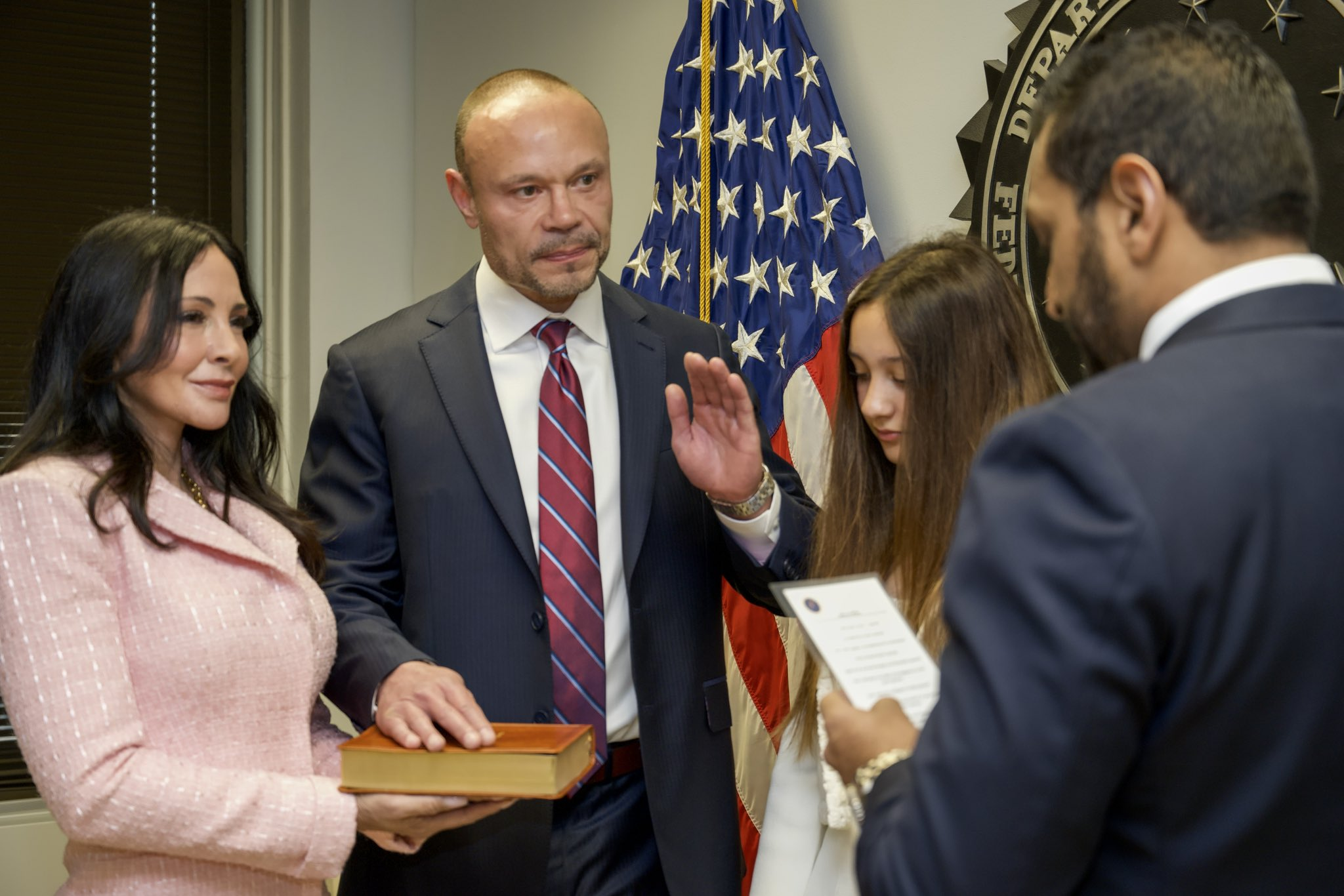
Bongino being sworn in by Director of the FBI Kash Patel, March 17, 2025

On February 23, 2025, President Donald Trump announced on Truth Social that Bongino would be the next deputy director of the Federal Bureau of Investigation (FBI). Bongino took office on March 17. Unlike the FBI director, the position of deputy director does not require Senate confirmation. On August 18, The New York Times reported that Bongino would share a "co-deputy directorship" role with Missouri attorney general Andrew Bailey being tapped for the other "co-deputy director" position. Bailey became Co-Deputy Director of the FBI on September 15, 2025. On December 17, 2025, Bongino announced via Twitter that he would be stepping down as deputy director of the FBI in January 2026.

=== Reopened investigations ===
In May 2025, Bongino announced that he and Patel would reopen or dedicate additional resources to three unresolved investigations: the pipe bombs placed near the Republican National Committee and Democratic National Committee headquarters on January 5, 2021; the leak of the Dobbs draft opinion in 2022; and the discovery of cocaine at the White House in July 2023. Later that month, Bongino claimed on Fox News that the FBI had discovered a room containing documents from former FBI Director James Comey's tenure that had not been properly digitized or logged, stating "you're going to be stunned" by the contents once declassified.

=== Epstein files controversy ===
On July 11, CNN reported that Bongino was considering resigning over the Department of Justice's investigation into the death of Jeffrey Epstein.

=== Arctic Frost briefings ===
On October 6, 2025, Bongino briefed eight Republican senators on documents discovered during an FBI file review showing that the Arctic Frost investigation had obtained their phone toll records in 2023. The records covered January 4–7, 2021, and none of the senators were under investigation. Bongino stated, "It is a disgrace that I have to stand on Capitol Hill and reveal this — that the FBI was once weaponized to track the private communications of U.S. lawmakers for political purposes."

=== January 6 pipe bomb arrest ===
On December 4, 2025, the FBI arrested Brian Cole Jr. in connection with the pipe bombs placed near the RNC and DNC headquarters on January 5, 2021. Attorney General Pam Bondi credited the arrest to work by Bongino and Patel, stating, "This cold case languished for four years until Director Patel and Deputy Director Bongino came to the FBI." Current and former officials disputed that characterization, telling CNN that the evidence had not been "gathering dust."

Before joining the FBI, Bongino had claimed on his podcast that the pipe bombs were an "inside job" and that the FBI was engaged in a "massive cover-up." When asked about his previous statements on Fox News following the arrest, Bongino said, "I was paid in the past, Sean, for my opinions. That's clear. And one day I will be back in that space, but that's not what I'm paid for now. I'm paid to be your deputy director, and we base investigations on facts."

=== 2026 resignation ===
On December 17, 2025, Bongino announced he would be resigning as FBI deputy director in January 2026. Bongino's resignation was commented on by Trump, who shared on X that Bongino "wants to go back to his show", referring to his podcast. Bongino officially left his position on January 3, 2026.

== Political views and statements ==
In 2018, Bongino said, "My entire life right now is about owning the libs. That's it." He is a supporter of president Donald Trump.

According to Mother Jones, Bongino is a member of Groundswell, a group of conservative activists working to advance conservative causes.

Bongino has called the investigation of possible Trump–Russia collusion a "total scam". He has promoted claims that the FBI improperly surveilled the Trump campaign in 2016, which The New York Times described as "conspiracy theories that fueled right-wing disbelief in the nation's most powerful law enforcement agencies". In May 2018, Trump quoted Bongino as saying that former CIA director John Brennan "has disgraced the entire Intelligence Community" and was "worried about staying out of jail".

In May 2018, after Republican congressman Trey Gowdy challenged Trump's claims that the FBI had surveilled his 2016 presidential campaign, Bongino said Gowdy had been "fooled" by the Department of Justice. In February 2019, he accused Deputy Attorney General Rod Rosenstein of attempting a coup against Trump.

In June 2020, Bongino testified before the House Judiciary Committee during hearings on police brutality, saying that efforts to reduce police funding were an "abomination" that should be dropped "before someone gets hurt".

The Associated Press reported that Bongino "became one of the leading personalities in the Make America Great Again political movement to spread false information about the 2020 election," noting that claims of widespread fraud "have been widely rejected as false by judges and former Trump attorney general William Barr." An NBC News analysis of Bongino's podcast transcripts from 2017 to 2025 found more than 21,000 mentions of "FBI" or "deep state," describing him as "one of the loudest supporters of unfounded claims that the 2020 election was stolen." The advocacy organization Avaaz listed Bongino among the top five "superspreaders of election misinformation" on social media.

Bongino criticized face mask mandates during the COVID-19 pandemic, stating that masks are largely ineffective and referring to them as "face diapers".

== Writing ==
Bongino has authored multiple books related to his career in law enforcement, politics, and support for Donald Trump.

His first book, Life Inside the Bubble, was published in 2013 and details his experiences as a Secret Service agent, including his work protecting presidents George W. Bush and Barack Obama, investigating federal crimes, and running for the U.S. Senate. In 2016, he released The Fight: A Secret Service Agent's Inside Account of Security Failings and the Political Machine, which focuses on security issues and political corruption.

In 2019, Bongino published Spygate: The Attempted Sabotage of Donald J. Trump, which promotes the disproven Spygate conspiracy theory, alleging improper surveillance of Donald Trump's 2016 campaign. Later that year, he released Exonerated: The Failed Takedown of President Donald Trump by the Swamp, which was listed on The New York Times Best Seller list with a dagger symbol, indicating bulk sales influenced its ranking. In August 2020, Bongino denied that bulk purchases had contributed to the book's placement, stating that the only bulk sales event took place a month after it appeared on the list.

== Personal life ==
Bongino is married to Paula Andrea, née Martinez, who was born in Colombia. They have two daughters. In 2012, he and his wife operated three home-based businesses, selling martial arts apparel, designing websites, and consulting on security and risk management. While running for office in 2016, Bongino resisted talking about his business interests and said he and his wife had shut them down.

Bongino lived in Severna Park, Maryland, from 2002 until 2015, when he relocated to Palm City, Florida.

Bongino announced in June 2020 that he had purchased an "ownership stake" of unspecified value in Parler, an alternative social media platform.

=== Cancer diagnosis ===
On September 23, 2020, Bongino announced that a seven-centimeter tumor had been found in his throat. He added that he was unsure if the tumor was cancerous or benign, but would fly to New York on September 25 for further screening. On October 2, he said that he had received a "bad phone call" from doctors, and announced that he would be undergoing surgery on October 7.

Following his surgery, he tweeted that the "entire tumor" was removed from his neck, but that he likely had lymphoma. He said he would receive treatment in the future. On October 16, he confirmed that he received an official diagnosis of Hodgkin lymphoma, adding that he would be continuing treatment in consultation with his doctors.

== Electoral history ==
2016 Florida's 19th Congressional District Republican Primary
Party	Candidate	Votes	%
Republican	Francis Rooney	46,800	52.73
Republican	Chauncey Goss	26,520	29.88
Republican	Dan Bongino	15,434	17.39
Total votes		88,754	100.00

2014 Maryland's 6th Congressional District General Election
Party	Candidate	Votes	%
Democratic	John Delaney (incumbent)	94,704	49.7
Republican	Dan Bongino	91,930	48.2
Green	George Gluck	3,762	2.0
Total votes		190,536	100.00

2014 Maryland's 6th Congressional District Republican Primary
Party	Candidate	Votes	%
Republican	Dan Bongino	23,933	83.5
Republican	Harold W. Painter Jr.	4,718	16.5
Total votes		28,651	100

United States Senate election in Maryland, 2012
Party	Candidate	Votes	%	±%
Democratic	Ben Cardin (incumbent)	1,402,092	55.41	+1.20
Republican	Dan Bongino	674,649	26.66	−17.53
Independent	Rob Sobhani	420,554	16.62	N/A
Libertarian	Dean Ahmad	30,672	1.21	+1.21
N/A	Others (write-in)	2,583	0.10	+0.05
Majority		727,443	100.00	
Turnout		2,530,550	68.23	
Democratic hold		Swing		

United States Senate Election in Maryland, 2012 Republican Primary
Party	Candidate	Votes	%
Republican	Dan Bongino	66,561	33.8
Republican	Richard J. Douglas	55,907	28.4
Republican	Joseph Alexander	17,567	8.9
Republican	Bro Broadus	10,503	5.3
Republican	Rick Hoover	10,241	5.2
Republican	John B. Kimble	10,088	5.1
Republican	David Jones	8,002	4.1
Republican	Corrogan R. Vaughn	7,869	4.0
Republican	William Thomas Capps Jr.	6,768	3.4
Republican	Brian Vaeth	3,602	1.8
Total votes		204,268	100

== Publications ==
- Bongino, Dan (November 19, 2013). Life Inside the Bubble: Why a Top-Ranked Secret Service Agent Walked Away from It All. WND Books. ISBN 978-1-9380-6736-5. OCLC 858126450.
- — (January 12, 2016). The Fight: A Secret Service Agent's Inside Account of Security Failings and the Political Machine. St. Martin's Press. ISBN 978-1-2500-8298-5. OCLC 924683173.
- — (October 6, 2020). Follow the Money: The Shocking Deep State Connections of the Anti-Trump Cabal. New York: Post Hill Press. ISBN 978-1-6429-3659-9.
- — (September 12, 2023). The Gift of Failure (And I'll rethink the title if this book fails!). New York: Post Hill Press (Liberatio Protocol). ISBN 979-8-8884-5063-5.

Party political offices
Preceded by Michael Steele	Republican nominee for U.S. Senator from Maryland (Class 1); 2012	Succeeded by Tony Campbell
Government offices
Preceded by Robert Kissane; Acting	Deputy Director of the Federal Bureau of Investigation; 2025–2026; Served alongside: Andrew Bailey (2025–2026)	Succeeded by Andrew Bailey
