= Hamzah Saadah =

Palestinian-American digital creator and activist

- Born: March 17, 2003 (age 23); New Jersey, United States
- Other names: Absorber, AbsorberYT
- Occupations: Content creator, gamer, activist
- Years active: 2017–present
- Known for: Gaming videos, TikTok activism, political interviews
- Website: YouTube channels: Absorber, Hamzah Daily, and Hamzah Saadah

Hamzah Saadah (born March 17, 2003), known online as Absorber or AbsorberYT, is a Palestinian-American digital content creator, professional gamer, social media personality, and activist. He gained prominence through his gaming content on YouTube and TikTok, amassing a combined social media following of over 10 million. Since 2023, he has become known for viral, politically charged conversations with Israeli citizens and soldiers, drawing attention to the Israeli - Palestinian conflict.

== Early life and background ==
Hamzah Saadah was born in New Jersey, United States, on March 17, 2003, to Palestinian parents. Though raised in the U.S., he maintains strong cultural ties to Palestine. Saadah began producing content as a teenager, focusing on gaming, prank videos, and comedic skits.

== Career ==
=== Gaming and entertainment ===
Known online as Absorber, Saadah built his audience by streaming Fortnite and Call of Duty gameplay, uploading reaction videos, and performing skits. His YouTube channel has amassed over 3 million subscribers, while his TikTok account has surpassed 7 million followers as of 2025.

In 2020, Saadah applied for the FaZe 5 challenge, a global talent search by the esports organization FaZe Clan—and made it into the top 20 finalists out of millions of entries. Saadah has expressed long-term ambitions to expand into acting, lifestyle content, and late-night television hosting.

=== Activism and viral political content ===
In the wake of the October 7, 2023 escalation in Gaza, Saadah began recording and posting conversations with Israeli civilians and active-duty Israel Defense Forces (IDF) soldiers via platforms such as TikTok LIVE and OmeTV. These unscripted interactions, often featured IDF personnel admitting or boasting about violence toward Palestinians. In one widely viewed instance, two Israeli soldiers laughed and said they wished the IDF would kill more Palestinian children. The video was removed from TikTok shortly after gaining two million views but later re-uploaded on Instagram and YouTube. Saadah has said that he initially feared backlash for speaking openly about his Palestinian identity, but his decision to do so sparked a wave of support and awareness among global audiences. He has since made it his mission to expose the everyday normalization of violence in Israeli discourse regarding Palestinians.

=== Influence and public response ===
Saadah’s videos have been credited with helping global audiences, particularly Gen Z, gain a more nuanced understanding of the Israeli-Palestinian conflict. His work has been featured in media outlets such as The New Arab, where he was described as part of a new wave of diaspora creators using humor, empathy, and digital savvy to bring attention to human rights violations in Gaza. Activists and journalists such as Lara Elborno have cited his content as evidence of widespread dehumanization of Palestinians, arguing that such videos illustrate the “genocidal intent” often expressed casually by Israeli individuals online. Fans of Saadah have also responded strongly. Many, like Mexican-Native American digital creator Mea Marie, credit him with opening their eyes to the reality in Palestine and reshaping their views on the conflict. His ability to remain composed and respectful in even the most hostile conversations has earned him praise across cultural and political lines.

=== Future career and plans ===
Despite his increasing focus on political activism, Saadah continues to develop his entertainment career. He has expressed ambitions to create lifestyle content, form a gaming organization, and eventually host a late-night talk show. His brand continues to center on positivity, mental health awareness, and creating a safe, inclusive digital space.
