= Sam Bahour =

American businessman and entrepreneur

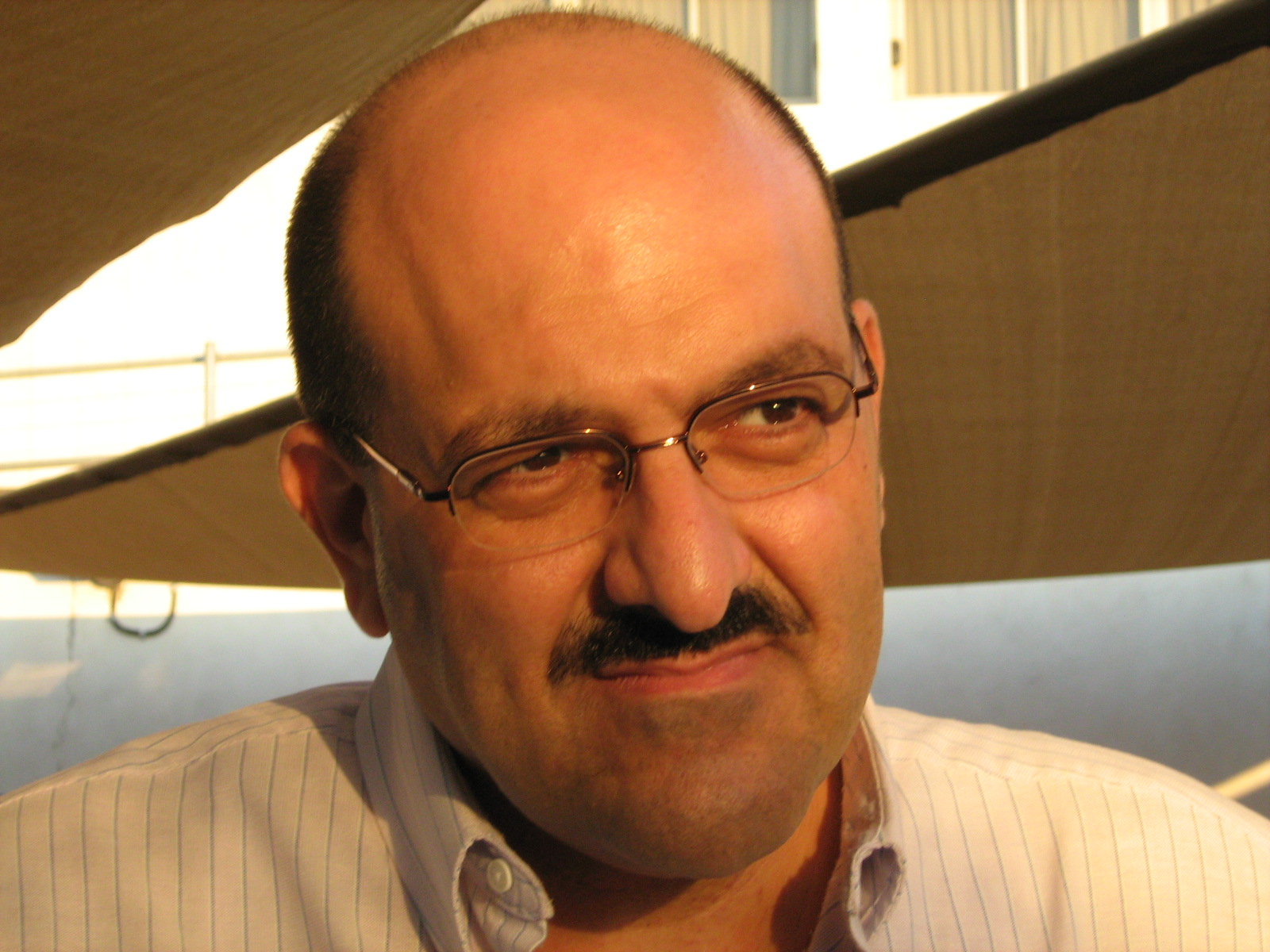
- Born: October 18, 1964 (age 62); Youngstown, Ohio, U.S.
- Education: Youngstown State University
- Occupation: Managing Partner of Applied Information Management (AIM)
- Spouse: Abeer Barghouty (m. 1993)
- Children: Areen Bahour, Nadine Bahour
- Website: http://www.aim.ps

Sam Bahour is an American businessman and entrepreneur.

== Early life and education ==
Bahour was born in Ohio in 1964, to a Palestinian father and Lebanese-American mother. He moved with his family to the West Bank in the 1990s following the signing of Oslo Accords to become involved in developing the economy of the future Palestinian state.

He graduated from Youngstown State University in 1989 with a degree in computer technology, and subsequently worked for several American software firms, before moving to the West Bank in 1995.

In addition, he earned an MBA in a joint program between Northwestern University in Illinois and Tel Aviv University in Israel.

== Career ==
Since relocating to the West Bank, Bahour has been involved in numerous business development initiatives. He was part of a group of businessmen who established the Palestine Telecommunications Company. He also founded several private businesses, and led the establishment of a publicly-listed (PEX) Western-style shopping center in the West Bank, the Arab Palestinian Shopping Centers.

He has voiced support on Twitter for the Boycott, Divestment and Sanctions Movement against Israel for its crimes against the Palestinian people.

On 6 April 2021, Bahour, along with American-Israeli professor Bernard Avishai, addressed J Street on the topic of the confederation model for resolving the Israeli–Palestinian conflict. The confederation model was the subject of a New York Times opinion piece authored by Bahour and Avishai in February of that year.
