= Rob Sobhani =

Iranian-American author and professor (born 1960)

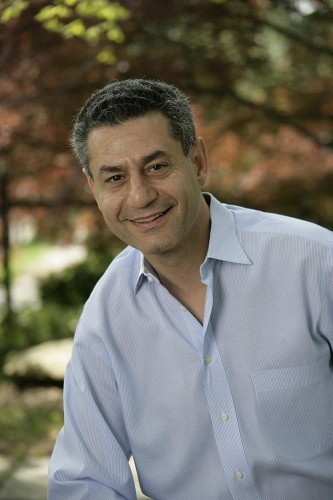
- Born: Sohrab Sobhani; February 14, 1960 (age 66); Fort Leavenworth, Kansas, U.S.
- Education: Georgetown University
- Political party: Independent (since 2011)
- Other political affiliations: Republican (before 2011)

Sohrab Sobhani (born February 15, 1960) is an Iranian-American author and lecturer on energy issues, U.S. immigration policies and U.S. policy toward the Middle East.

Formerly a professor at Georgetown University, Sobhani is currently the Chief Executive of Caspian Group. He is the founder and CEO of Sparo Corporation. Sobhani serves on the Board of Z Advanced Computing (ZAC).

Sobhani has published one book on immigration: Press 2 for English: Fix Immigration, Save America, and two books on foreign affairs: King Abdullah of Saudi Arabia: A Leader of Consequence and The Pragmatic Entente: Israeli–Iranian Relations, 1948–1988.

Sobhani ran as an independent candidate for the United States Senate in Maryland in 2012 against Republican nominee Daniel Bongino, Libertarian Dean Ahmad, and Democratic incumbent Ben Cardin. He received 16.4 percent of the vote, beating the state's all-time mark for an independent or third-party candidate.

== Early life and education ==
Sobhani was born in Kansas and as a child, lived in Iran, his family's ancestral home. After 1979, his parents fled Iran due to the Islamic Revolution and immigrated to the United States, where Sobhani had already begun his higher education.

He earned first his bachelors and later his PhD in Political Economy at Georgetown University, where he later served as an adjunct professor in political economy. Sobhani is an usher at the St. Francis Episcopal Church in Potomac, is married and has two children, and has lived with them in Montgomery County for the last 33 years.

== Career ==
Sobhani is the co-founder, CEO, and chairman of Caspian Group holdings, LLC, (Caspian Group). The Caspian Group is a "multidisciplinary group of companies with broad international business interests in the fields of energy (including green renewables), infrastructure development, high technology, publishing and strategic advisory services".

In 2012, Sobhani, with the National Oil and Gas Authority, Petra Solar, and the Bahrain Petroleum Company, made an agreement to bring American-made "smart" solar technology to the township of Awali, the University of Bahrain, and other locations in Bahrain. "Smart solar is an innovative approach that couples solar with smart grid technology and is deployed in partnership with utility companies to generate clean, safe renewable energy while making the electric infrastructure more stable, efficient and energy-independent. This approach builds large-scale solar in a reliable fashion that avoids future costs of rebuilding the grid."

In 1990, the then-Soviet Union state Azerbaijan was negotiating with BP for its offshore oil exploration. Sobhani, an Azeri-speaking American, was sought out by Communist Party leader Ayaz Mutalibov, who decided to allow Amoco a chance to get the deal. In 1991, after Sobhani's talks with Mutalibov, Amoco was granted exclusive rights to the Azeri oil field for one year. Eventually, several companies took a share of the offshore exploration after the fall of the Soviet Union.

=== U.S. Senate campaigns ===
Prior to 2012, Sobhani made two runs for the United States Senate in Maryland as a Republican, losing both times in the primary: first in 1992 when he lost to Alan L. Keyes, and again in 2000 when he lost to Paul Rappaport.

In 2012, as an independent, Sobhani primarily ran on a platform of jobs and education. He pledged to accomplish these five goals:

- $3 billion investment in Maryland's roads and bridges through public-private partnerships.
- $1 billion in public-private partnerships to finance the reconstruction of residential homes within inner-city Baltimore. Through microloans pegged to areas of urban blight the plan seeks to support home ownership and the revitalization of communities.
- $500 million investment from global non-profit organizations to support cancer research and treatment in Maryland directed towards Johns Hopkins, University of Maryland and the National Institutes of Health.
- $150 million investment from global non-profit organizations to fund scholarships/internships for low-income students in Maryland.
- $1 billion in exports for Maryland-based companies by linking Maryland to export markets around the world.

Sobhani pledged to only run for two terms, not to run for a second term if he didn't accomplish his five goals, and reach out to both parties if they are willing.

=== Sparo Corporation ===
In 2014, Sobhani founded Sparo Corporation, an e-commerce company focused on social responsibility.

== Personal life ==
In a radio interview, Sobhani has stated that he has previously fund-raised for the Urban Alliance Foundation. The non-profit will receive according to his plan a $150 million investment from global non-profit organizations to fund scholarships/internships for low-income students in Maryland.

== Writing and media appearances ==
Sobhani has contributed as a pundit to the following news organizations:

- The Hill
- The Washington Times
- CNN
- The Christian Science Monitor
- Huffington Post
- The Baltimore Sun
- The Hoya
- Forbes

He has also made appearances for his campaign on the following shows:

- CBS Baltimore with Pat Warren
- WBAL (AM) with C4
- WYPR with Dan Rodricks
- America Tonight with Kate Delaney
