= Hallo Berlin =

Restaurant in New York City, New York, U.S.

Coordinates: 40.76112°N 73.99418°W

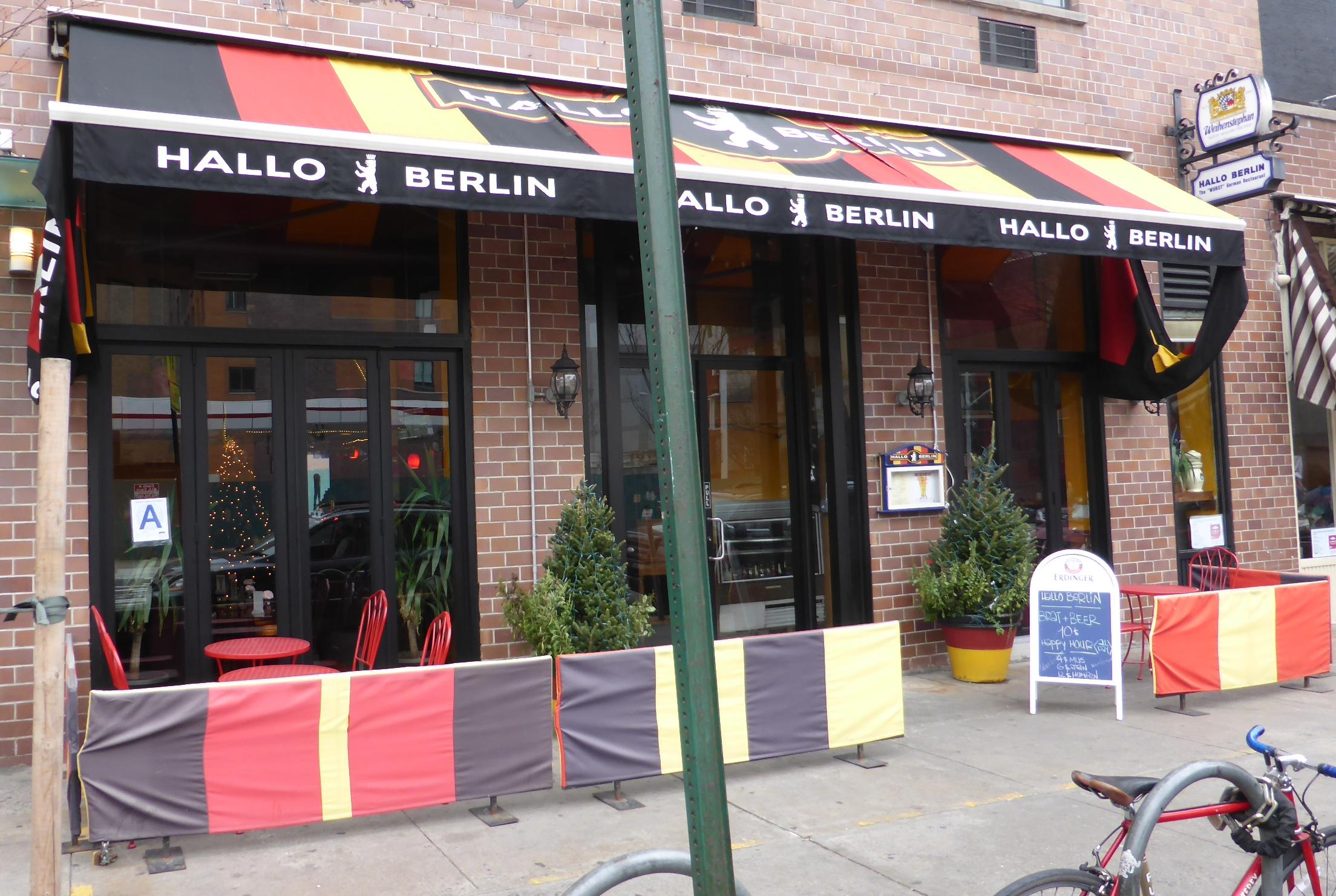
- Interactive map of Hallo Berlin

Restaurant information
- Closed: 2017; 9 years ago
- Location: New York City, New York

Hallo Berlin was a restaurant at 626 Tenth Avenue between West 44th and 45th Streets in the Hell's Kitchen neighborhood of New York City. It consisted of a beer garden restaurant and a street cart. They served authentic German beer and cuisine like frankfurters, sauerkraut, potato pancakes, red cabbage, spätzle, wursts and other foods. Hallo Berlin's motto was: "New York's wurst restaurant." The owners announced the restaurant's closure in June 2017.

There was also an outlet in Conklin, New York. The restaurants were operated by Rolf Babiel until his death in October 2009, and his wife and sons.

Hallo Berlin's pushcart was located on 54th Street and Fifth Avenue in Manhattan. In 2004, New York magazine named it one of four "best power lunches" in the city. It was also awarded the Vendy Award in 2005, ranking first among New York City's street food vendors.
