= Yousef Khanfar =

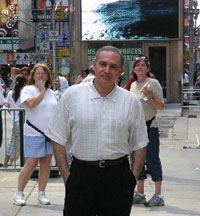
- Yousef Khanfar attending a conference at Caux, Switzerland.
- Born: 1956 (age 69–70); Kuwait
- Occupation: Photographer
- Known for: Photography

Yousef Khanfar is a Palestinian-American photographer and author.

He was born in 1956 in Kuwait to Palestinian refugee parents who fled their homeland after the establishment of the state of Israel. Khanfar began taking photographs at the age of six, when his father gave him his first camera.

At the age of 17, Khanfar moved to the United States, and spent the next twenty years traveling the world taking photographs. He currently resides in Oklahoma City.

Khanfar's photography has been published in magazines such as Oprah, International Photo Art, and Outdoor Photography. He has also published two books of his work: 2000's Voices of Light, and 2007's In Search of Peace, recipient of the 2007 IP Outstanding Book of the Year Award.

== Publications ==
=== Voices of Light ===
Khanfar's first publication, this book displays various landscape photographs around the world, along with poetry written by Khanfar. Described as displaying the "secrets and mysteries of nature", Yousef Khanfar uses this book to show how, although he may have lost his homeland, he now views the whole world as his homeland.

=== In Search of Peace ===
Winner of the 2007 IP Outstanding Book of the Year in the category of "Most Life-Changing", and selected to be gifted in the Global Symposium of Peaceful Nations by the Fulbright Center for Peace in Washington, DC, this book displays a message of universal healing for humanity and peace between nations. This publication is split into three sections: "Sublime", "Freedom", and "Divine". The first section displays images of natural conflict, representing the human conflict we face. The second section, consisting mostly of impressionist images, represents the human freedom of expression. The final section contains images that represent peace and divinity, the final goal that Khanfar views for humanity.

=== Invisible Eve ===
His latest publication, Khanfar photographs women imprisoned for nonviolent crimes. Capturing the living quarters, day-to-day life, and quotes from the women regarding their situation, Khanfar hopes to give these forgotten women a voice for others to hear. He intends these messages to discourage other boys and girls from committing crimes and ending up in prison.

== Portraiture ==
Yousef Khanfar has also captured the portraits of many influential figures including Sandra Day O'Connor and Emma Nicholson, Baroness Nicholson of Winterbourne. Justice O'Connor has also praised Khanfar's portraiture work, stating that she was "stunned and overcome with the beauty of your photograph". Other notable portraits include that of David Wynne, Leona Mitchell, and Tariq Ramadan.

== General references ==
- Profile of Yousef Khanfar at the Institute for Middle East Understanding
- Yousef Khanfar at AfterImage Gallery
- Yousef Khanfar at the Oklahoma Arts Council
- Yousef Khanfar Praise and Reviews
- Yousef Khanfar About Me
