= Street Vendor Project =

Food vendor advocacy non-profit in New York City, U.S.

The Street Vendor Project is a food vendor advocacy organization in New York City, United States. It is partnered with the Urban Justice Center.

== History ==
The project was founded in 2001 as part of the Urban Justice Center by Sean Basinski, a then-law student who worked as a food cart vendor during several summers. He stepped down in 2019 and ceded leadership to his co-director Mohamed Attia, an Egyptian immigrant, who joined the project as a vendor around 2012 and became more involved through their campaign to lift the caps on street vending permits.

== Organization ==
The project "helps vendors understand their rights and obligations" and provides services including "representing vendors in court, providing legal advice, and helping license them". It "also functions as an advocacy group, fighting for legislation that would support the vending community".

The Street Vendor Project's staff include people that speak the five most spoken languages within the New York City street vendor community: Spanish, Mandarin, Arabic, Bangla, and Wolof French.

The project advocates for "churro ladies", mostly immigrant women who sell churros in the New York City subway. They are often arrested for selling food without licenses.

== Recognition ==
The project was featured in an episode of New York Times Cooking's YouTube series On The Job hosted by Priya Krishna, where she interviewed and shadowed Sonia Pérez, a member of and activist with the project who has been a tamale street vendor for over 25 years and at the time of publishing (2022) had been waiting for a permit for 25 years; as well as interviewed Carina Kaufman-Gutierrez who was at that time the project's deputy director; and showed a monthly meeting of the project's members. Other street food vendors in various neighborhoods of New York City were also featured.

In March 2026 under the Mamdani Administration, Kaufman-Gutierrez, former co-director of the Street Vendor Project, was appointed executive director of the newly formed Office of Street Vendor Services at the New York City Department of Small Business Services.

== Vendys ==
The Street Vendor Project oversaw the Vendy Awards, annual awards to the best street vendors. It ended in 2019.

Past winners of the Vendy Awards include: Hallo Berlin (2005), King of Falafel & Shawarma (winning both the "Vendy's Cup" and "People's Choice" in 2010, finalist in 2009 and 2007), and Kelvin Natural Slush Co. (2010, Best Dessert Truck).
