= Minaret of Freedom Institute =

Islamic libertarian organization

Coordinates: 38°59′35.3″N 77°5′13.2″W

- Established: 1993
- President: Imad-ad-Dean Ahmad
- Budget: Revenue: $21,834; Expenses: $16,708 (FYE December 2015)
- Address: 4323 Rosedale Avenue; Bethesda, MD 20814
- Location: Bethesda, Maryland, United States
- Website: www.minaret.org

The Minaret of Freedom Institute is an Islamic libertarian organization established in 1993 and based in Bethesda, Maryland. It is dedicated to educating both Muslims and non-Muslims. It was co-founded by Imad-ad-Dean Ahmad, its president, and Shahid N. Shah, its treasurer. Its early board of advisers included former Richard Nixon advisor Robert D. Crane, a convert to Islam, and Charles Butterworth, a University of Maryland Islamic scholar. Its current board of directors and board of advisers include religious, academic and business leaders.

== Mission ==
Its Mission Statement aims for non-Muslims are:

- "to counter distortions and misconceptions about Islamic beliefs and practice"
- "to demonstrate the Islamic origins of modern values like the rule of law and sciences like market economics
- "to advance the status of Muslim peoples maligned by a hostile environment in the West and oppressed by repressive political regimes in the East"

Its Mission Statement aims for Muslims (in concert with Qur'an and the Sunnah obligations) are:

- "to discover and publish the politico-economic policy implications of Islamic law (shari`ah) and their consequences on the economic well-being of the community"
- "to expose both American and Islamic-world Muslims to free market thought"
- "to educate Islamic religious and community leaders in economics and in the fact that liberty is a necessary, though not sufficient, condition for the achievement of a good society"
- "to promote the establishment of free trade and justice (an essential common interest of Islam and the West)"

It implements these goals through independent scholarly research into policy issues of concern to Muslims; publication of scholarly and popular expositions of such research; translation of appropriate works on the free market into the languages of the Muslim world; and the operation of a scholars exchange program.

== Religious views ==
=== Sharia law ===
The Institute holds that adherence to Sharia law and even Islamist politics can be compatible with libertarian ideas. In a paper delivered at a 2005 Center for the Study of Islam and Democracy conference Imad-ad-Dean Ahmad noted the similarities of American secularism and Islamic law, argued that the free exercise of religion is inherently part of Islamic law and outlined a vision of "Islamic pluralism" where the traditional dhimmi system of protection of non-Muslims must be explicitly protected constitutionally.

In 2006 Imad-ad-Dean Ahmad commented on the Saudi Arabian Embassy's Islamic Affairs Department distribution of "The Noble Koran" which included commentary that disparaged Jews and Christians. Ahmad told The Washington Post "The outcry was so great...People were disgusted. And it wasn't just liberals. I couldn't find an American Muslim who had anything good to say about that edition. I would call it a Wahhabi Koran."

Imad-ad-Dean Ahmad has been quoted as calling the September 11th attacks in the name of Islam as an offense against Islam. He has written that it is the moral duty of Muslims to identify the perpetrators and their supporters and “confront them with the fact that their actions have violated sharia’ah (sic) in a most egregious manner, to urge them to repent and to punish them if the families of the victims are unwilling to be merciful and accept compensation.”

=== Loan interest ===
The institute deviates from orthodox Islamic thinking in its belief that the Qur'anic prohibition of riba (usury) does not prohibit all lending at interest, only that which is excessively high. Imad-ad-Dean Ahmad has stated that the Islamic world pioneered the scientific method, but may have been unable to progress to an Industrial Revolution because the prohibition of interest prevented would-be inventors from obtaining the necessary financing to develop their inventions.

=== Circumcision ===
With regards to female circumcision, Imad-ad-Dean Ahmad writes that clitoridectomy and infibulation should be viewed as practices prohibited by Islam because they jeopardize the girl's future ability to enjoy sexual relations with her husband, and hence should be considered disliked. He dismisses hygienic or religious justifications for "this painful and potentially harmful practice." Ahmad supports male circumcision, writing that although it is not prescribed in the Qur'an "male circumcision is clearly a Muslim tradition."

== Political views ==
=== Civil liberties ===
In 1999 the Institute sponsored a panel on “Secular Threats to Freedom of Expression,” which was labeled “secular fundamentalism," and identified as being as great a threat to liberty as religious fundamentalism. Two speakers shared their personal stories, Merve Kavakçı, an elected Turkish parliamentarian removed from office because she insisted on wearing the hijab (Islamic headcovering) and Sami Al-Arian, a tenured University of South Florida professor who at the time was threatened with dismissal because a former leader of his dialogue group of Muslim and non-Muslim intellectuals later was identified as the head of the Palestinian Islamic Jihad. Al-Arian described how the 1996 immigration legislation had led to 29 individuals being held in prison for years under “secret evidence” provisions, noting that 28 were Muslims.

After the September 11th attacks Imad-ad-Dean Ahmad spoke out about suspicion of and accusations against Muslims that worried many American Muslims, making them more cautious. After the U.S. government closed down the Holy Land Foundation for Relief and Development charity and convicted its leaders of financing terrorism, Ahmad stated that the convictions shocked Muslims, confused donors and “seems to give a green light for further intimidation of Muslim charities.”

In 2006 Imad-ad-Dean Ahmad and Minaret Vice President Aly R. Abuzaakouk signed a letter in “defense of free speech” condemning “any intimidation or threats of violence directed against any individual or group exercising the rights of freedom of religion and speech; even when that speech may be perceived as hurtful or reprehensible.” They expressed concern about threats “made against individual writers, cartoonists, and others by a minority of Muslims” and called on all Muslims to “refrain from violence.”

=== Sami Al-Arian ===
The Minaret of Freedom has supported Sami Al-Arian who was indicted in 2003 for alleged terrorist ties to Palestinian Islamic Jihad, acquitted of most charges by a jury that deadlocked on other charges. After spending more time in jail, in 2006 Al-Arian plead guilty to conspiracy and was sentenced to 57 months in prison and deportation upon release.

In 2006 an Alexandria, Virginia grand jury subpoena was issued to the Minaret of Freedom Institute seeking notes about the symposium on “The United States and Iran: It’s Time to Talk” that he moderated in 1999. Imad-ad-Dean Ahmad told the New York Sun that he believed the agents sought information because Sami Al-Arian had attended the event. He noted that the same prosecutor seeking Al-Arian’s grand jury testimony at the time had signed the subpoena. Ahmad never was required to testify to the grand jury.

=== Anti-imperialism ===
Imad-ad-Dean Ahmad told Reason magazine that Western liberals had abandoned their anti-imperialist views, including by invading Iraq, and thus had alienated Islamists from pro-liberty viewpoints. He stated Western government financial support for various factions in Muslim and Arab countries tends to prop up the most oppressive elements.

=== Opposition to Zionism ===
The Institute defines the Israeli–Palestinian conflict in terms of Israel's violations of individual property rights, starting with the fact that Jews owned only 7 percent of the land in Palestine in 1948 but have gained control of most of it as of today. Ahmad states that "Israelis employ a series of strategies to keep pressure on the indigenous people to leave."

In his address to the First Conference on Jerusalem in Beirut, Lebanon in 2001 Imad-ad-Dean Ahmad expressed his desire for the "liberation of Jerusalem." He stated that American’s support for Zionism was due to their hearing “only what the Zionist-controlled media and politicians have let them know” and the failure of Palestinians to be "frank and direct with the people of America and the world, preferring to work with corrupt governments in the Muslim world or with power-hungry revolutionary movements." He stated the American people were unaware of "Zionism’s history, its racist foundation, its colonialist nature, and the systematic brutality of its daily dealings with the indigenous people of Palestine.” In 2003 Ahmad told Reason magazine that the Zionist movement had socialist and fascist wings, neither supportive of classical liberalism and that Israel today is “characterized mostly as a socialist, militarist and racist entity,” which he held are incompatible with “libertarian ideals.”
