= Amit Forlit =

Israeli private investigator

- Occupation: Private investigator
- Known for: Alleged involvement in hacking-for-hire scheme

Amit Forlit is an Israeli private investigator. He is currently wanted by the United States for allegedly overseeing a "hacking for hire" campaign. In April 2025, his extradition to the United States was approved by a court in the United Kingdom.

== See also ==
- Cybercrime
- Israel–United States relations
