= Hircine =

Hircine may refer to:

- Something of or relating to the domestic goat
- Something of or relating to the members of genus Capra
- Hircine, a fictional god from The Elder Scrolls series
