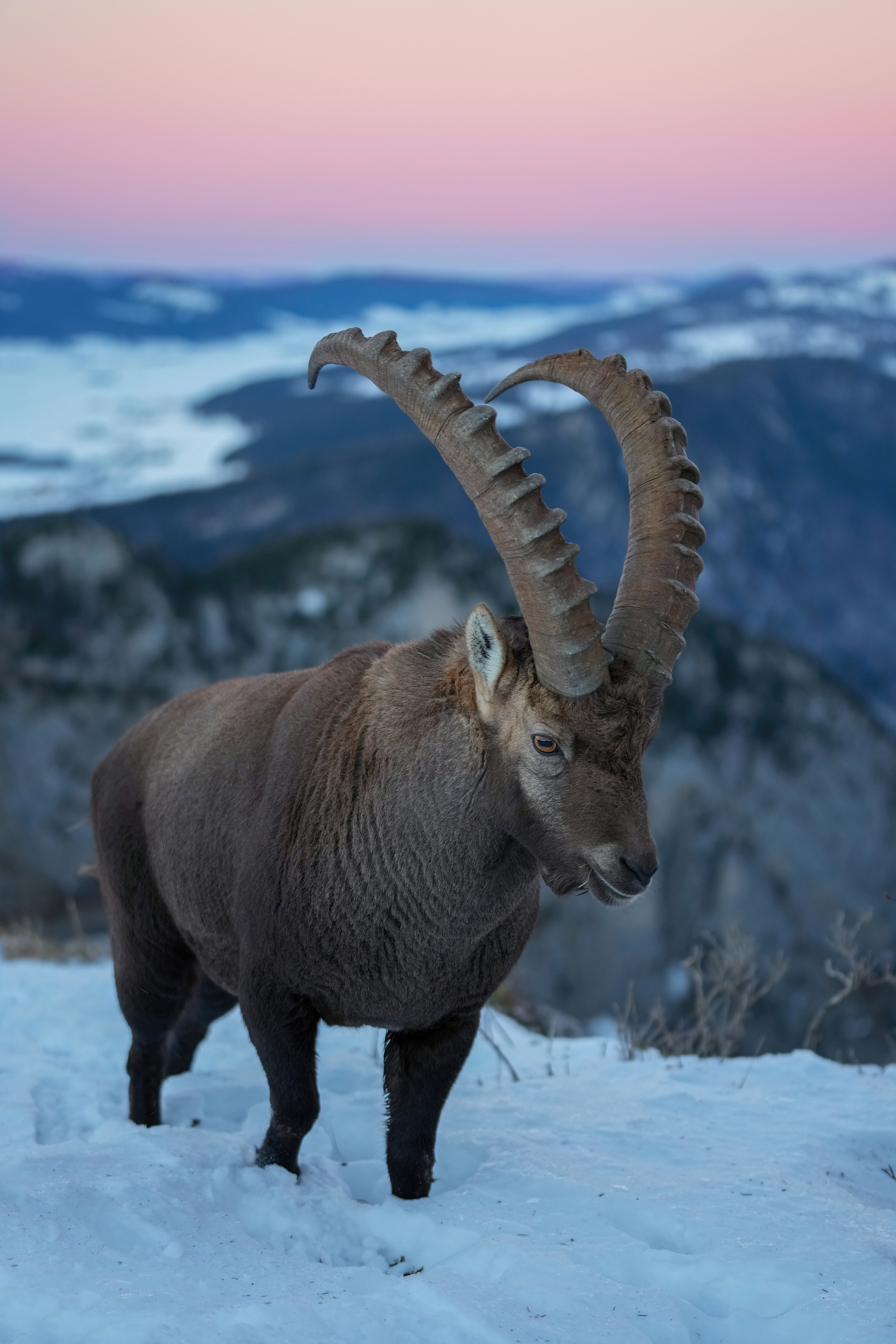
- Male
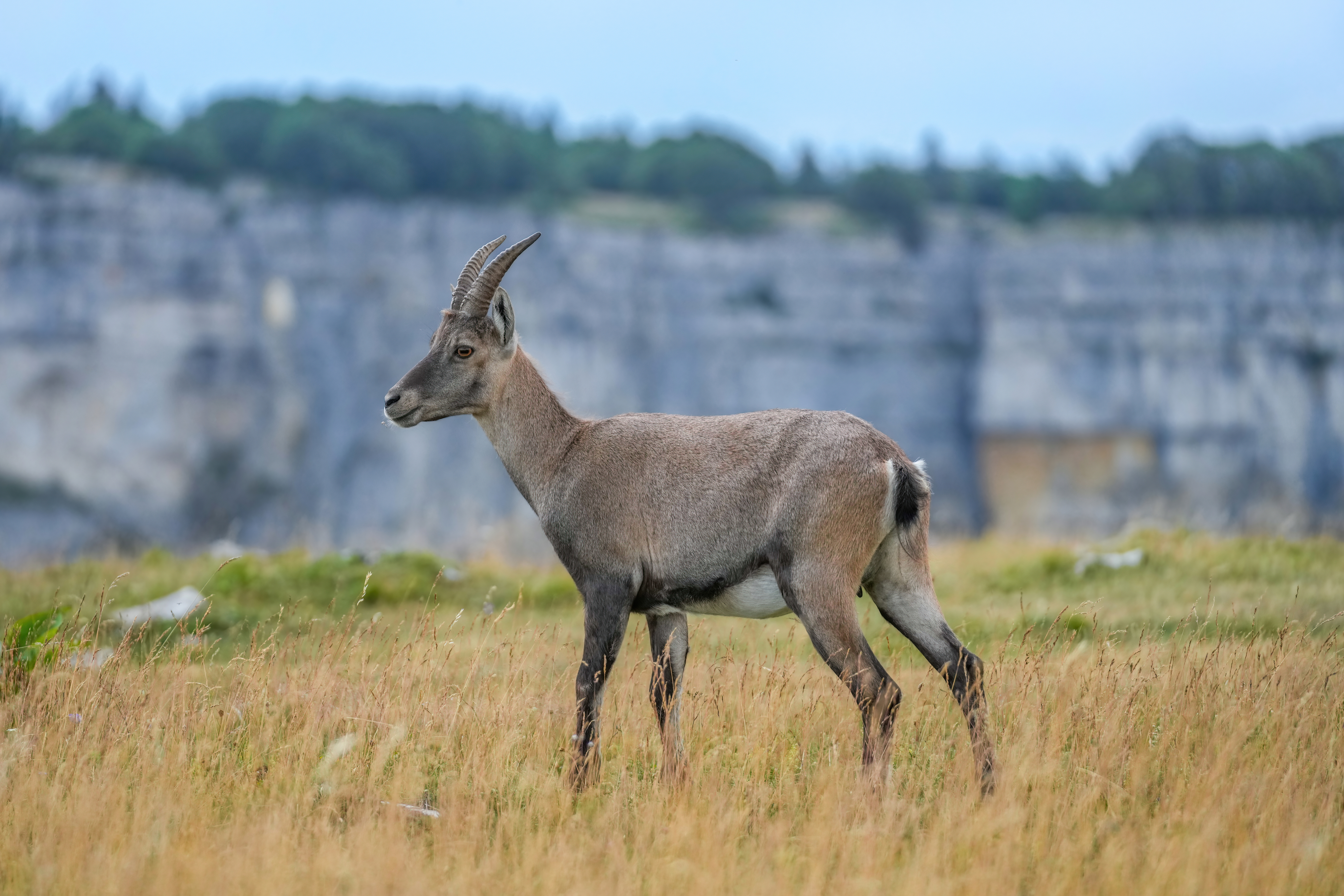
- Female

Conservation status
- Least Concern (IUCN 3.1)

Scientific classification
- Kingdom: Animalia
- Phylum: Chordata
- Class: Mammalia
- Order: Artiodactyla
- Family: Bovidae
- Subfamily: Caprinae
- Genus: Capra
- Species: C. ibex

Binomial name
- Capra ibex Linnaeus, 1758
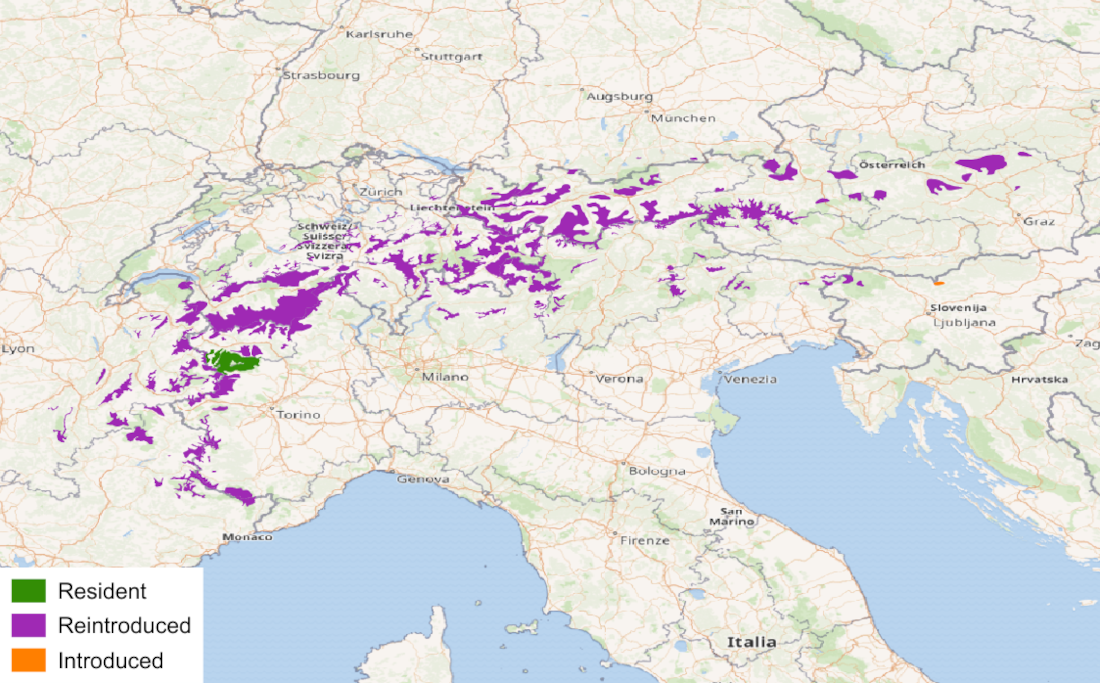
- Distribution of the Alpine ibex (population in Bulgaria not included)

= Alpine ibex =

Species of mammal

The Alpine ibex (Capra ibex), also known as the steinbock, is a European species of goat which lives in the Alps. It is one of ten species in the genus Capra, and its closest living relative is the Iberian ibex. The Alpine ibex is a sexually dimorphic species; males are much larger and carry much larger, longer horns than females. Its coat is brownish-grey. Alpine ibexes tend to live in steep, rough terrain and open alpine meadows. They can be found at elevations as high as 3,300 m (10,800 ft) and their sharp hooves allow them to scale the steep slopes and cliffs of their mountainous habitat.

Alpine ibexes primarily feed on grass and are active throughout the year. Although they are social animals, adult males and females segregate for most of the year, coming together only to mate. During the breeding season, males use their long horns to fight for access to females. Ibexes have few predators but may succumb to parasites and diseases.

By the 19th century, human hunters extirpated the Alpine ibex from most of its range, driving it near to extinction. It went through a population bottleneck of fewer than 100 individuals, all living in Gran Paradiso National Park, Italy. Despite its ensuing very low genetic diversity across populations, the species has been successfully reintroduced to parts of its historical range. As of 2020, the IUCN lists the species as being of least concern.

== Taxonomy ==
Carl Linnaeus first described the Alpine ibex in 1758. It is classified in the genus Capra with nine other species of goat. Capra is Latin for 'she-goat' while the species name ibex is translated from Latin as 'chamois' and is possibly derived from an earlier Alpine language.

Fossils of the genus Tossunnoria are found in late Miocene deposits in China; these fossils appear to have been transitional between goats and their ancestors. The genus Capra may have originated in Central Asia and spread to Europe, the Caucasus, and East Africa from the Pliocene and into the Pleistocene. Mitochondrial and Y chromosome evidence show hybridisation of species in this lineage. Fossils of the Alpine ibex dating from the last glacial period during the late Pleistocene have been found in France and Italy. The Alpine Ibex and the Iberian ibex (C. pyrenaica) probably evolved from the extinct Pleistocene species Capra camburgensis, whose fossils have been found in Germany. The Alpine ibex appears to have been larger during the Pleistocene than in the modern day.

In the 20th century, the Nubian (C. nubiana), walia (C. walie), and Siberian ibex (C. sibirica) were considered to be subspecies of the Alpine ibex; populations in the Alps were given the trinomial of C. i. ibex. Genetic evidence from 2006 has supported the status of these Ibexes as separate species.

The following cladogram of seven Capra species is based on 2022 mitochondrial evidence:

- Capra
  - Siberian ibex
  - - Nubian ibex
    - - Markhor
      - - - Domestic goat
          - Bezoar ibex
        - - Alpine ibex
          - Iberian ibex

== Appearance ==
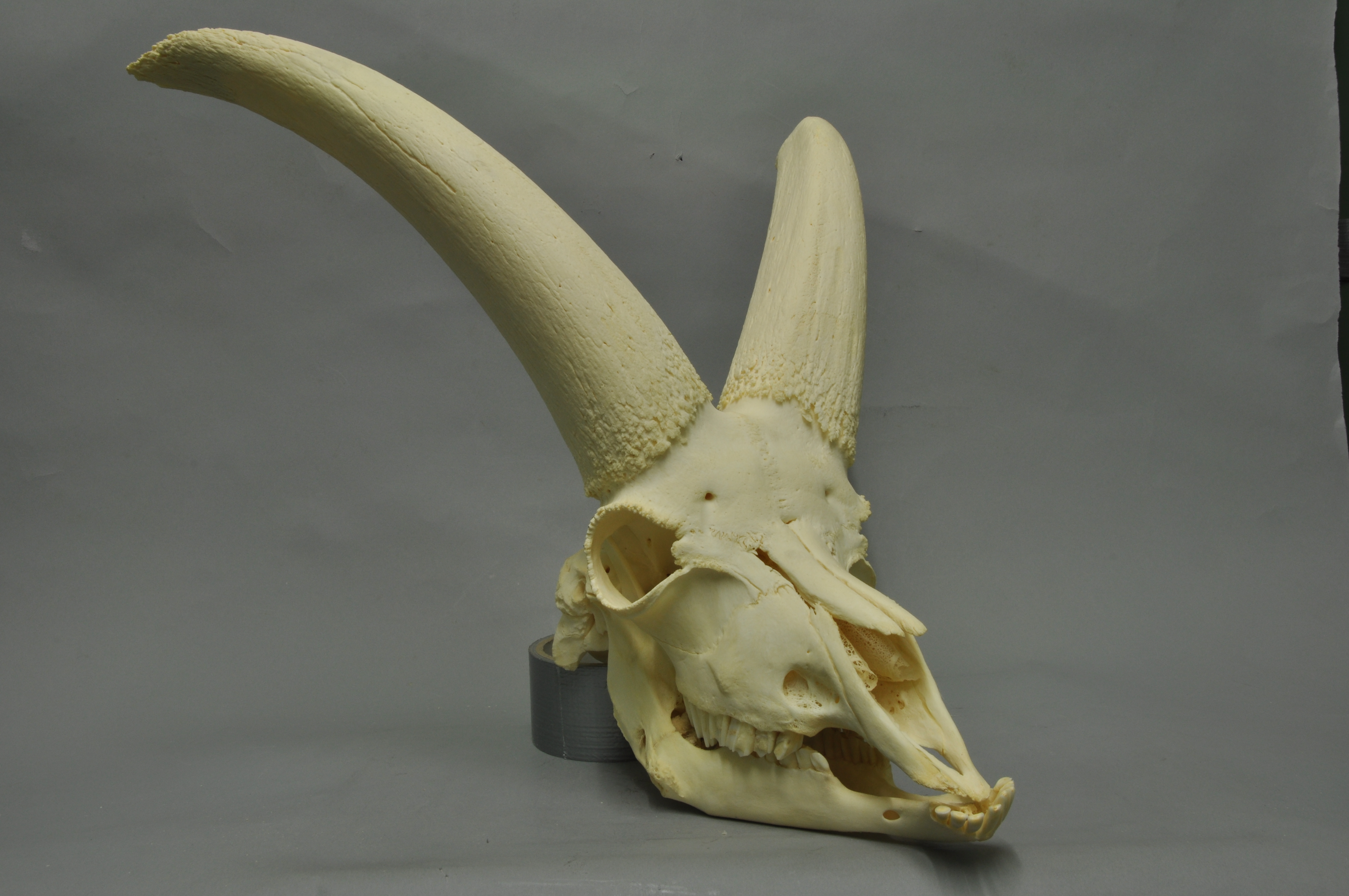
Male ibex skull

Alpine ibexes are sexually dimorphic. Males grow to a height of 90 to 101 cm (35 to 40 in) at the withers with a body length of 149–171 cm (59–67 in) and weigh 67–117 kg (148–258 lb). Females are much smaller and have a shoulder height of 73–84 cm (29–33 in), a body length of 121–141 cm (48–56 in), and weigh 17–32 kg (37–71 lb).

The Alpine ibex is a stocky animal with a tough neck and robust legs with short metapodials. Compared with most other wild goats, the species has a wide, shortened snout. Adaptations for climbing include sharp, highly separated hooves and a rubbery callus under the front feet. Both male and female Alpine ibexes have large, backwards-curving horns with an elliptical cross-section and a trilateral-shaped core. Transverse ridges on the front surface of the horns mark an otherwise flat surface. At 69–98 cm (27–39 in), the horns of males are substantially longer than those of females, which reach only 18–35 cm (7.1–13.8 in) in length.

The species has brownish-grey hair over most of its body but lighter in colour on the belly with dark markings on the chin and throat. The hair on the chest region is nearly black and there are stripes along the dorsal (back) surface. The Alpine ibex is duller-coloured than other members of its genus. As with other goats, only males have a beard. Ibexes moult in spring, when their thick winter coat consisting of woolly underfur is replaced with a short, thin summer coat. Their winter coat grows back in the autumn. As in other members of Capra, the Alpine ibex has glands near the eyes, groin, and feet but none on the face.

== Distribution and habitat ==
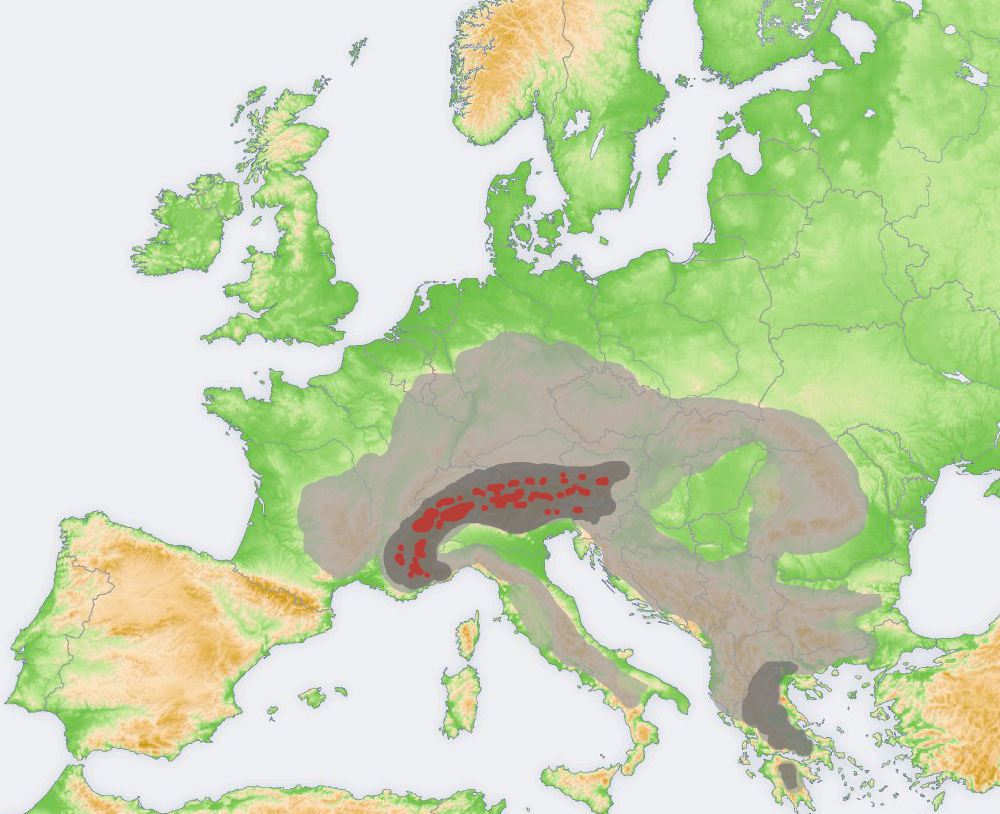
Distribution of the alpine ibex during the Pleistocene (light grey), Holocene (dark grey) and Present (red)

Ibex along its mountain habitat.

The Alpine ibex is native to the Alps of central Europe; its range includes France, Switzerland, Liechtenstein, Italy, Germany, and Austria. Fossils of the species have been found as far south as Greece, where it became locally extinct about 7,500 years ago due to human predation. Between the 16th and 18th centuries, the species disappeared from much of its range due to hunting, leaving by the 19th century one surviving population in and around Gran Paradiso, Italy. The species has since been reintroduced into parts of its former range, as well as new areas such as Slovenia and Bulgaria.

The Alpine ibex is an excellent climber; it occupies steep, rough terrain at elevations of 1,800 to 3,300 m (5,900 to 10,800 ft). It prefers to live in open areas, but when there is little snow and depending on population density, adult males may gather in larch and mixed larch-spruce woodland. Outside the breeding season, the sexes live in separate habitats. Females are more likely to be found on steep slopes while males prefer more level ground. Males inhabit lowland meadows during the spring, when fresh grass appears, and climb to alpine meadows during the summer. In early winter, both males and females move to steep, rocky slopes to avoid dense buildups of snow. Alpine ibexes prefer slopes of 30–45°, and take refuge in small caves and overhangs.

== Behaviour and ecology ==
Alpine ibexes on Augstmatthorn in the Bernese Highlands, Switzerland

The Alpine ibex is strictly herbivorous. Its diet consists mostly of grass, which is preferred all year; during the summer, ibexes supplement their diet with herbs, while during autumn and winter they also eat dwarf shrubs and conifer shoots. The most-commonly eaten grass genera are Agrostis, Avena, Calamagrostis, Festuca, Phleum, Poa, Sesleria, and Trisetum. In the spring, animals of both sexes spend about the same amount of time feeding during the day, while in summer, females, particularly those that are lactating, eat more than males. High temperatures cause heat stress in large adult males, reducing their feeding time, but they may avoid this problem by feeding at night.

In Gran Paradiso, home ranges of the Alpine Ibex can exceed 700 ha (1,700 acres) and in reintroduced populations, home ranges may approach 3,000 ha (7,400 acres). Home-range size depends on the availability of resources and the time of year. Home ranges tend to be largest during summer and autumn, smallest in winter, and intermediate in spring. Females' home ranges are usually smaller than those of males. Ibexes do not hibernate during the winter; they take shelter on cold winter nights and bask in the mornings. They also reduce their heart rate and metabolism.

The Alpine ibex may compete for resources with chamois and red deer; the presence of these species may force the ibex to occupy higher elevations. The Alpine ibex's climbing ability is such that it has been observed scaling the 57-degree slopes of the Cingino Dam in Piedmont, Italy, where it licks salts. Only females and kids, which are lighter and have shorter legs than adult males, climb the steep dam. Kids have been observed at 49 m (161 ft) ascending in a zig-zag path and descending in straight paths.

=== Social behaviour ===
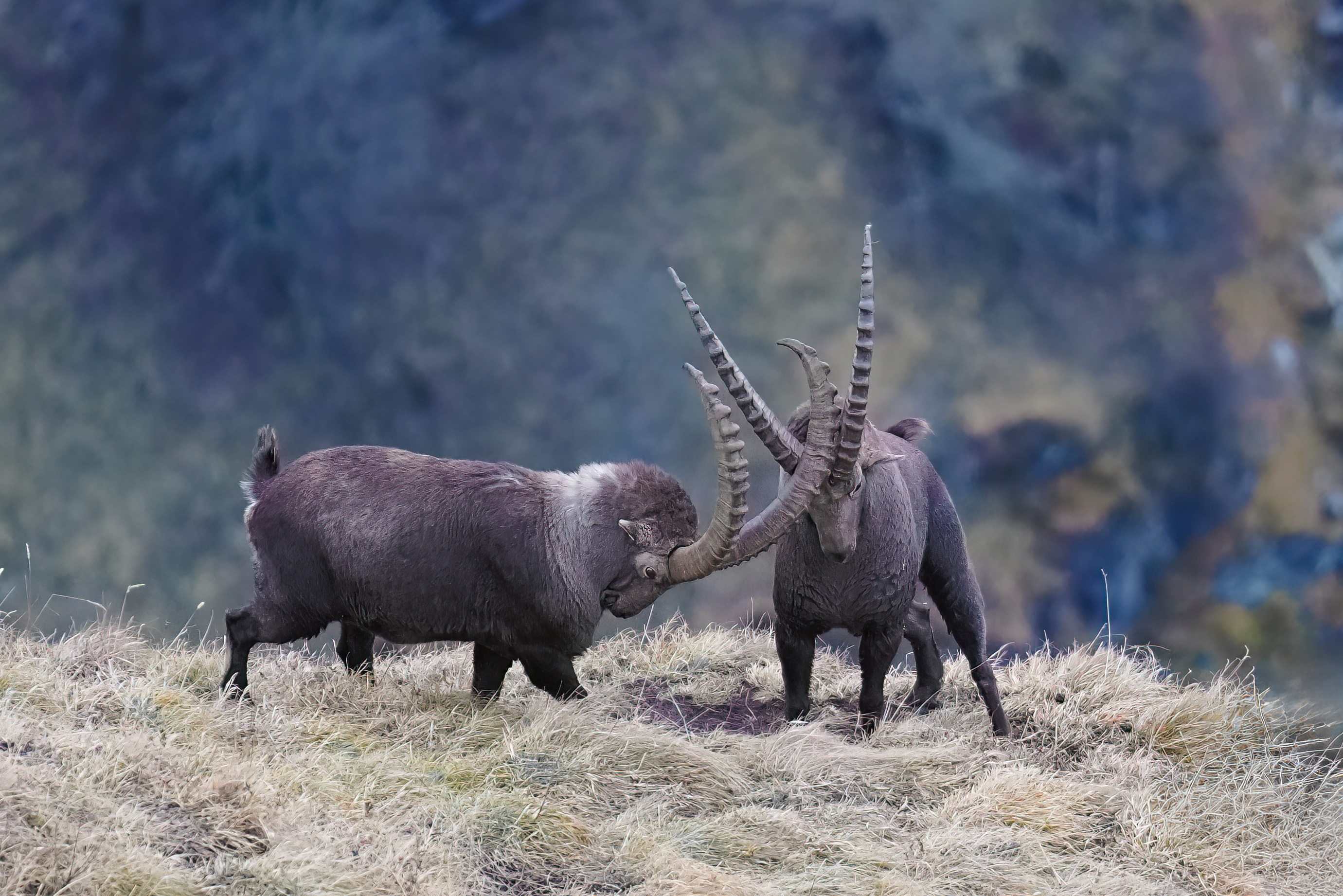
Males fighting

The Alpine ibex is a social species but it tends to live in groups that are based on sex and age. For most of the year, adult males group separately from females, and older males live separately from young males. Female groups consist of 5–10 members and male groups usually have 2–16 members but sometimes have more than 50. Dependent kids live with their mothers in female groups. Segregation between the sexes is a gradual process; males younger than nine years may still associate with female groups. Adult males, particularly older males, are more likely to be found alone than females. Social spacing tends to be looser in the summer, when there is more room to feed. Ibexes have stable social connections; they consistently regroup with the same individuals when ecological conditions force them together. Female groups tend to be more stable than male groups.

Adult males and females gather together in December and January, the breeding season, then separate again in April and May. Among males, a dominance hierarchy based on size, age, and horn length exists. Hierarchies are established outside the breeding season, allowing males to focus more on mating and less on fighting. Males use their horns for combat; they bash rivals' sides or clash head-to-head often by rearing then clashing downwards.

Alpine ibexes communicate mainly through short, sharp whistles that serve mostly as alarm calls and may occur singularly or in succession with short gaps. Females and their young communicate by bleating.

=== Reproduction and growth ===
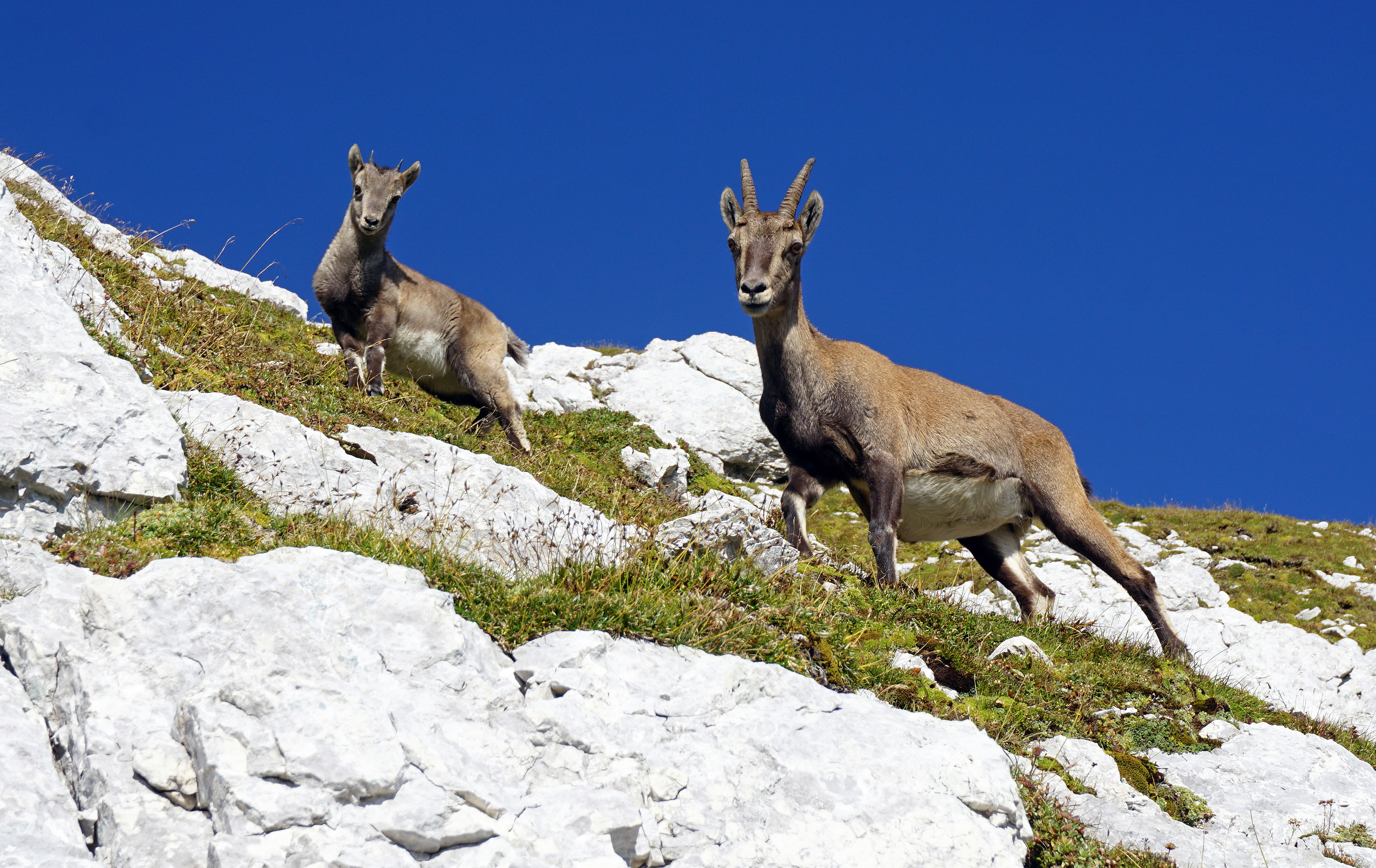
Mother with young

The mating season begins in December and typically lasts for around six weeks. During this time, male herds break up into smaller groups and search for females. The rut takes place in two phases. In the first phase, males interact with females as a group; in the second, one male separates from his group to follow a female in oestrus. Dominant males between nine and twelve years old follow a female and guard her from rivals while subordinate, younger males between two and six years old try to sneak past the tending male when he is distracted. If the female flees, both dominant and subordinate males will try to follow her. During courtship, the male stretches the neck, flicks the tongue, curls the upper lip, urinates, and sniffs the female. After copulation, the male rejoins his group and restarts the first phase of the rut. Environmental conditions can affect courtship; for example, snow can limit the males' ability to follow females and mate with them.

The female is in oestrus for around 20 days and gestation averages around five months, and typically results in the birth of one or sometimes two kids. Females give birth away from their social groups on rocky slopes that are relatively safe from predators. After a few days, the kids can move on their own. Mothers and kids gather into nursery groups, where young are nursed for up to five months. Nursery groups can also include non-lactating females. Alpine ibexes reach sexual maturity in 18 months but continue to grow until females are five to six and males are nine to eleven years old.

The horns grow throughout life. Young are born without horns, which become visible as tiny tips at one month and reach 20–25 mm (0.8–1.0 in) in the second month. In males, the horns grow at about 8 cm (3.1 in) per year for the first five-and-a-half years, slowing to half that rate once the animal reaches 10 years of age. The slowing of horn growth in males coincides with aging. The age of an ibex can be determined by annual growth rings in the horns, which stop growing in winter.

=== Mortality and health ===
Male Alpine ibexes live for around 16 years while females live for around 20 years. The species has a high adult survival rate compared with other herbivores around its size. In one study, all kids reached two years of age and the majority of adults lived for 13 years, although most 13-year-old males did not reach the age of 15. Alpine ibexes have a low rate of predation; their mountain habitat keeps them safe from predators like wolves, though golden eagles may prey on young. In Gran Paradiso, causes of death are old age, lack of food, and disease. They are also killed by avalanches.

Alpine ibexes may suffer necrosis and fibrosis caused by the bacteria Brucella melitensis, and foot rot caused by Dichelobacter nodosus. Infections from Mycoplasma conjunctivae damage the eye via keratoconjunctivitis and can lead to death rates of up to 30%. Ibexes can host gastrointestinal parasites such as coccidia, strongyles, Teladorsagia circumcincta, and Marshallagi amarshalli as well as lungworms, mainly Muellerius capillaris. Several individuals have died from heart diseases, including arteriosclerosis, cardiac fibrosis, sarcosporidiosis, and valvular heart disease.

== Conservation ==
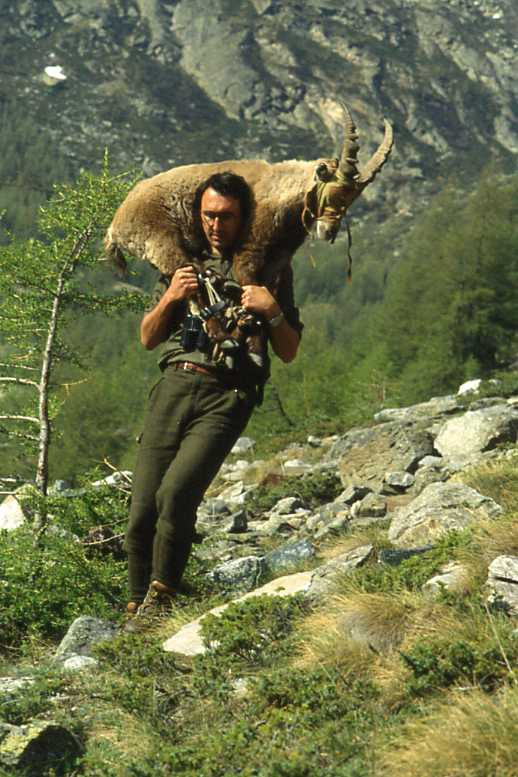
Biologist transporting an ibex for reintroduction

During the Middle Ages, the Alpine ibex ranged throughout the Alpine region of Europe. Starting in the early 16th century, the overall population declined due almost entirely to hunting by humans, especially with the introduction of firearms. By the 19th century, only around 100 individuals remained in and around Gran Paradiso in north-west Italy and on the Italian-French border. In 1821, the Government of Piedmont banned hunting of the Alpine ibex and in 1854, Victor Emmanuel II declared Gran Paradiso a royal hunting reserve. In 1920, his grandson Victor Emmanuel III donated the land to the state of Italy and it was established as a national park. By 1933, the Alpine ibex population reached 4,000 but subsequent mismanagement by the fascist government caused it to drop to around 400 by 1945. Their protection improved again after the war and by 2005, there were 4,000 in the national park. In the late 20th century, the Gran Paradiso population was used for reintroductions into other parts of Italy.

Starting in 1902, several Alpine ibexes from Gran Paradiso were taken into captive facilities in Switzerland for selective breeding and reintroduction into the wild. Until 1948, translocated founder animals were captive-bred. Afterwards, there were reintroductions of wild-born specimens from established populations in Piz Albris, Le Pleureur, and Augstmatthorn. These gave rise to the populations in France and Austria. Alpine ibexes also recolonised areas on their own. The Alpine ibex population reached 3,020 in 1914, 20,000 in 1991, and 55,297 in 2015, and by 1975, the species occupied much of its medieval range. In the 1890s, ibexes were introduced to Slovenia despite the lack of evidence of their presence there following the last glacial period. In 1980, ibexes were translocated to Bulgaria.

Between 2015 and 2017, there were around 9,000 ibexes in 30 colonies in France, over 17,800 individuals and 30 colonies in Switzerland, over 16,400 ibexes in 67 colonies in Italy, around 9,000 in 27 colonies in Austria, around 500 in five colonies in Germany, and almost 280 ibexes and four colonies in Slovenia. As of 2020, the IUCN considers the Alpine ibex to be of Least Concern with a stable population trend. It was given a recovery score of 79%, making it "moderately depleted". While the species would likely have gone extinct without conservation efforts in the 19th and 20th centuries, as of 2021, it has a low conservation dependence. According to the IUCN, without current protections, population decline of the species would be minimal. Some countries allow limited hunting.

Having gone through a genetic bottleneck, the Alpine ibex population has low genetic diversity and is at risk of inbreeding depression. A 2020 analysis found highly deleterious mutations were lost in these new populations but they had also gained mildly deleterious ones. The genetic purity of the species may be threatened by hybridisation with domestic goats, which have been allowed to roam in the Alpine ibex's habitat. The genetic bottleneck may increase vulnerability to infectious diseases because their immune system has low major histocompatibility complex diversity. In the Bornes Massif region of the French Alps, management actions, including a test-and-cull program to control outbreaks, effectively reduced Brucella infection prevalence in adult females from 51% in 2013 to 21% in 2018, and active infections also significantly declined.

== Cultural significance ==
An ibex on the arms of Grisons

The Alpine ibex is called the steinbock, which originated from the Old High German word steinboc, literally "stone buck". Several European names for the animal developed from this, including the French bouquetin and the Italian stambecco. The Alpine ibex is one of many animals depicted in the art of the Late Pleistocene-era Magdalenian culture in Western Europe. Local people used ibexes for traditional medicine; the horn material was used to counter cramps, poisoning, and hysteria, while the blood was thought to prevent stones from developing in the bladder. The species' value as a source of medicine led to its near extinction. Since its recovery, the Alpine ibex has been seen as a resilient symbol of the mountain range.

Ibex appear as a rare charge in English heraldry. The heraldic ibex appears as a variant of the heraldic antelope, which itself likely originated as an attempted to depict real-life antelopes or ibexes. Like the heraldic antelope, the ibex is depicted with a tusked head, a deer-like body, a series of tufts on its neck and back, and a long tail. The heraldic ibex is distinguished from the antelope by its saw-edged horns. The ibex is depicted on the coat of arms of the Swiss canton of Grisons.
