= Augstmatthorn =

Mountain in Switzerland

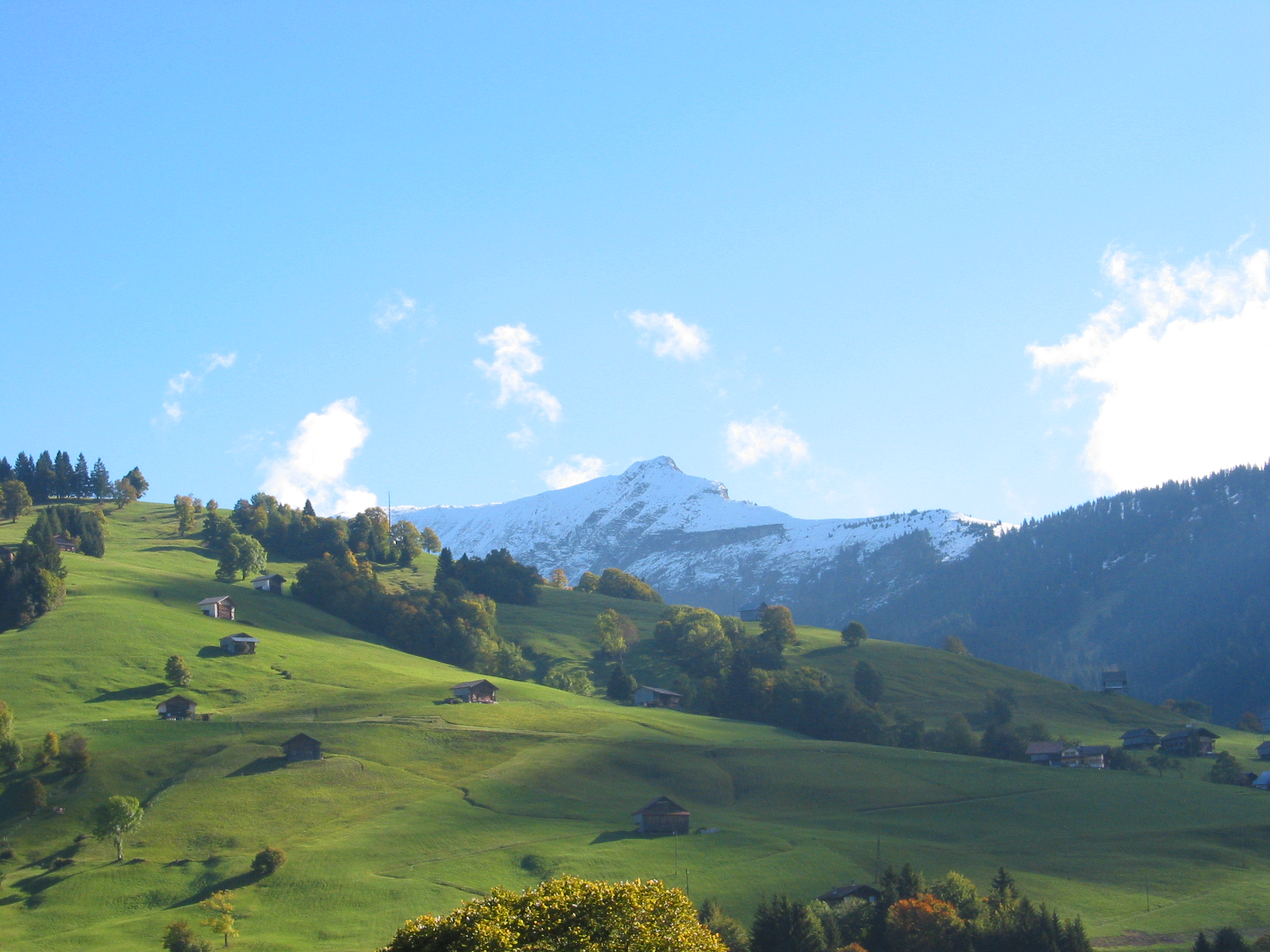
- The Augstmatthorn covered with snow

Highest point
- Elevation: 2,137 m (7,011 ft)
- Prominence: 272 m (892 ft)
- Parent peak: Brienzer Rothorn
- Coordinates: 46°44′32.2″N 7°55′43.3″E

Geography
- Location within Switzerland
- Location: Bern, Switzerland
- Parent range: Emmental Alps

The Augstmatthorn is a mountain of the Emmental Alps, overlooking Lake Brienz in the Bernese Oberland. The largely forested land from the top of the mountain southwards to the lake has been identified by BirdLife International as a 15,900 ha Important Bird Area. Augstmatthorn and its neighbouring peak Suggiture (2085 m) are both within a Federal Wildlife Protection Area as well as a protected moorland area.

== Fauna ==
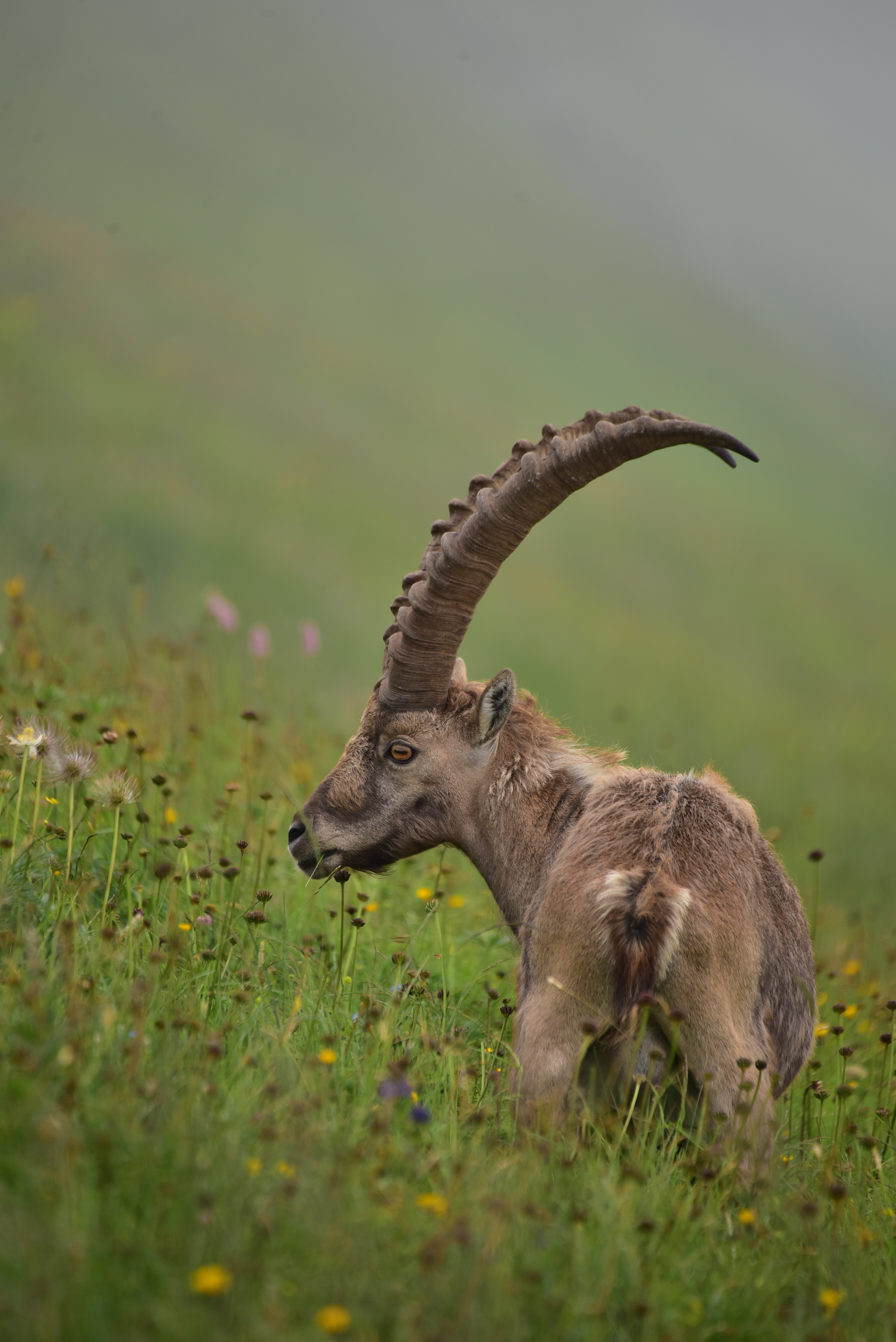
An Alpine Ibex on the Augstmatthorn

The first alpine ibex colony in the canton of Bern was settled on the Augstmatthorn at the beginning of the 20th century. The reintroduction was coordinated by the Alpine Game Park Interlaken-Harder, which had its first ibex again in 1913. The reintroduction was so successful that animals were recaptured from the Augstmatthorn to establish new colonies, such as on the Niederhorn.

Ibex can usually be observed on a hike up the Augstmatthorn.

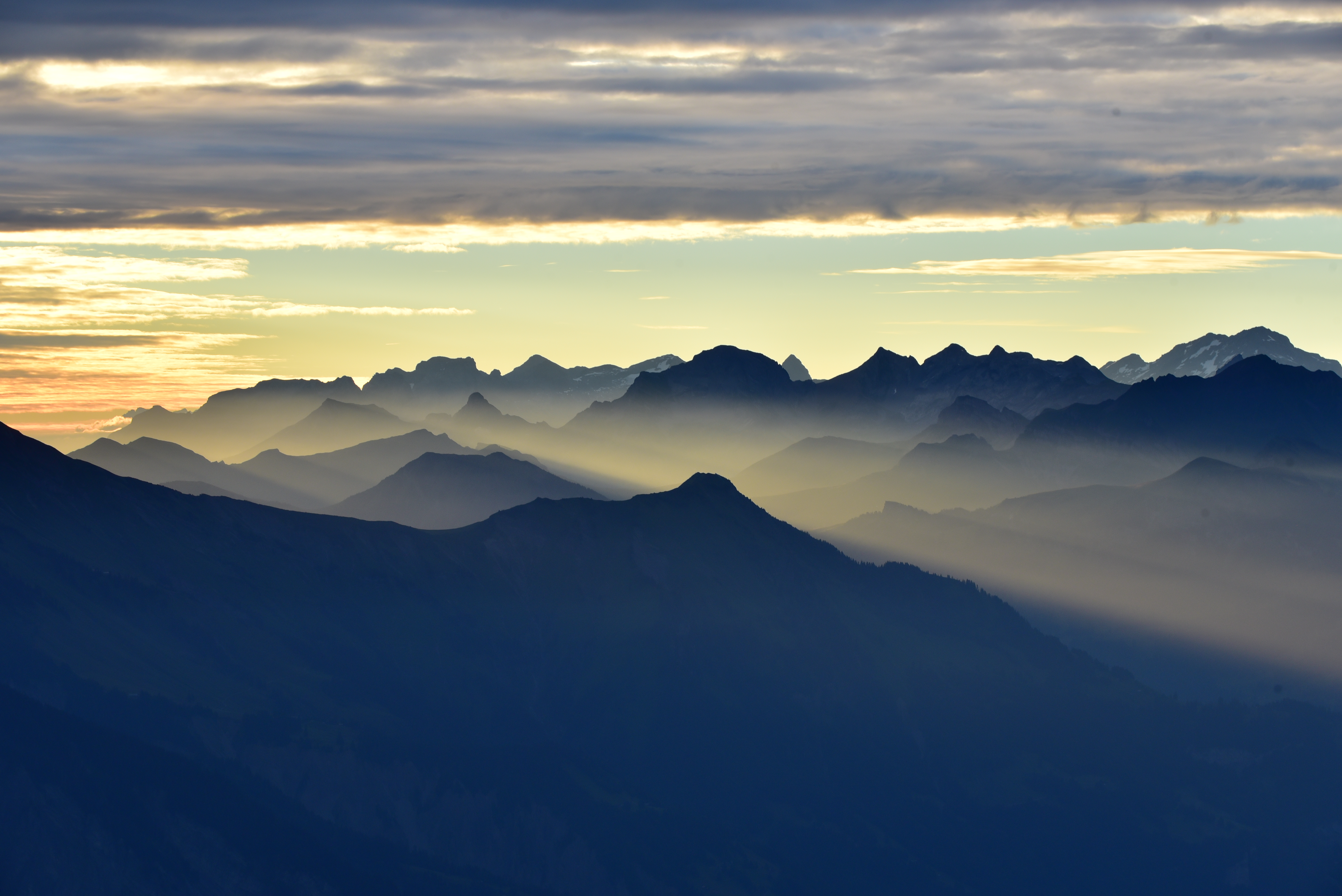
Sunrise on a summer morning on Augstmatthorn.

Besides ibex, golden eagles, chamois, red foxes, black grouse, ptarmigan and lynx also live in the area.
