= Turkmen wild goat =

Scientific classification
- Kingdom: Animalia
- Phylum: Chordata
- Class: Mammalia
- Order: Artiodactyla
- Family: Bovidae
- Subfamily: Caprinae
- Genus: Capra
- Species: C. aegagrus
- Subspecies: C. a. turcmenica

Trinomial name
- Capra aegagrus turcmenica Zalkin, 1950

Subspecies of mammal

The Turkmen wild goat or bearded goat (Capra aegagrus turcmenica) is a vulnerable sub-species of wild goat native to Iran and Turkmenistan. Turkmen wild goats are present in scattered populations in the central Kopet Dagh along the border between Turkmenistan and Iran between, and in the Large Balkhan (Bolshye) north of Nebit Dagh. It is closely related to domestic goats (Capra aegagrus hircus). As of 1986, their total population was estimated to be 7 000, and decreasing.
