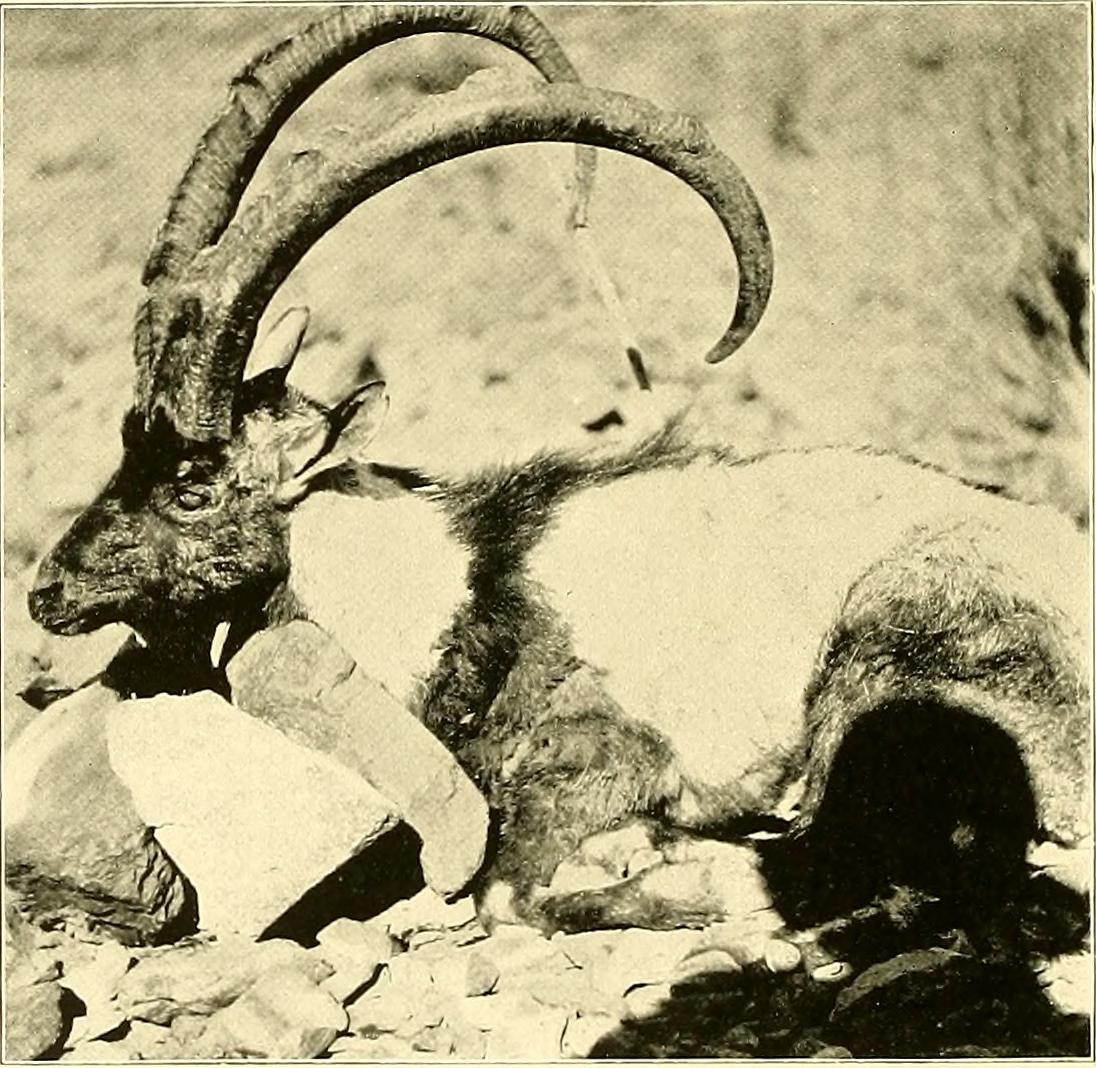

Scientific classification
- Kingdom: Animalia
- Phylum: Chordata
- Class: Mammalia
- Order: Artiodactyla
- Family: Bovidae
- Subfamily: Caprinae
- Genus: Capra
- Species: C. aegagrus
- Subspecies: C. a. blythi

Trinomial name
- Capra aegagrus blythi Hume, 1875

= Sindh ibex =

Subspecies of mammal

The Sindh ibex or Turkman wild goat (Capra aegagrus blythi) is a vulnerable subspecies of wild goat endemic to southwest Pakistan, and southeast Iran.

== Characteristics ==
Sindh ibex is a rather stocky animal with thick-set bodies and strong limbs terminating in broad hooves. Female and young males, till their second winter, are yellowish-brown varying to reddish-grey with a darker brown mid-dorsal line extending from between the shoulders to the base of the tail. Mature males are spectacularly beautiful, with long sweeping scimitar shaped horns over 102 cm (40 in) in length and almost silver white bodies offset by a sooty grey chest, throat and face. The extent of white hairs in the hind neck and body region of males increases with age.

The hair in summer coat is short and coarse and even in adult males is more reddish-buff in colour. Males have short beards, but females lack any beard. The belly and outside of the lower limbs, beard and forepart of the face vary from black to deep chestnut-brown in mature males. There is also a conspicuous black stripe in adult males, running from the withers down the front of the shoulders and merging with the black chest. Older males have a dark face pattern. The horns are strongly keeled in front, sweeping upwards and outwards with the tips generally diverging.

== Behaviour and ecology ==
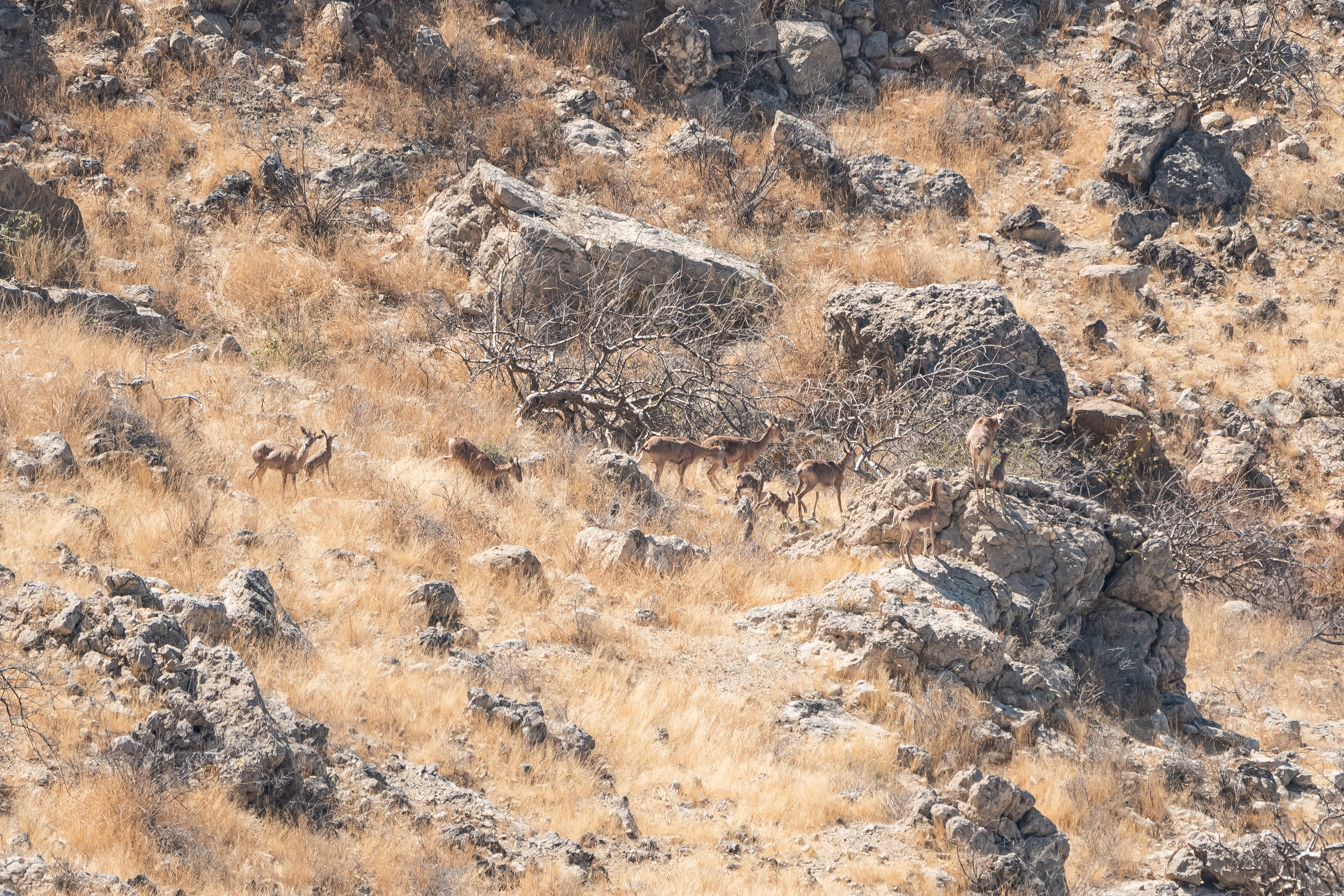
Female Sindh ibex at Kirthar National Park

This wild goat is gregarious, and if undisturbed will congregate in fairly large herds. The older male associate with such herds but generally keep together, often on the periphery of the main band. When disturbed, they are much more wary and ascend into inaccessible crags very early in the morning, emerging again just before dusk.

During the hottest part of the year, they lie up more extensively during the day and may graze a considerable part of the night. Wild goats have a wonderful sense of balance and can make a standing leap 1.75 m (5–6 ft) upwards on a seemingly vertical rock surface. They appear almost slow and deliberate when traversing rock faces but can slide without injury down almost perpendicular rock faces with drops as much as 4–6 m. When challenging another male these wild goats frequently stand up on their hind legs and at the same time bend their head to one side before charging forward and clashing their horns.

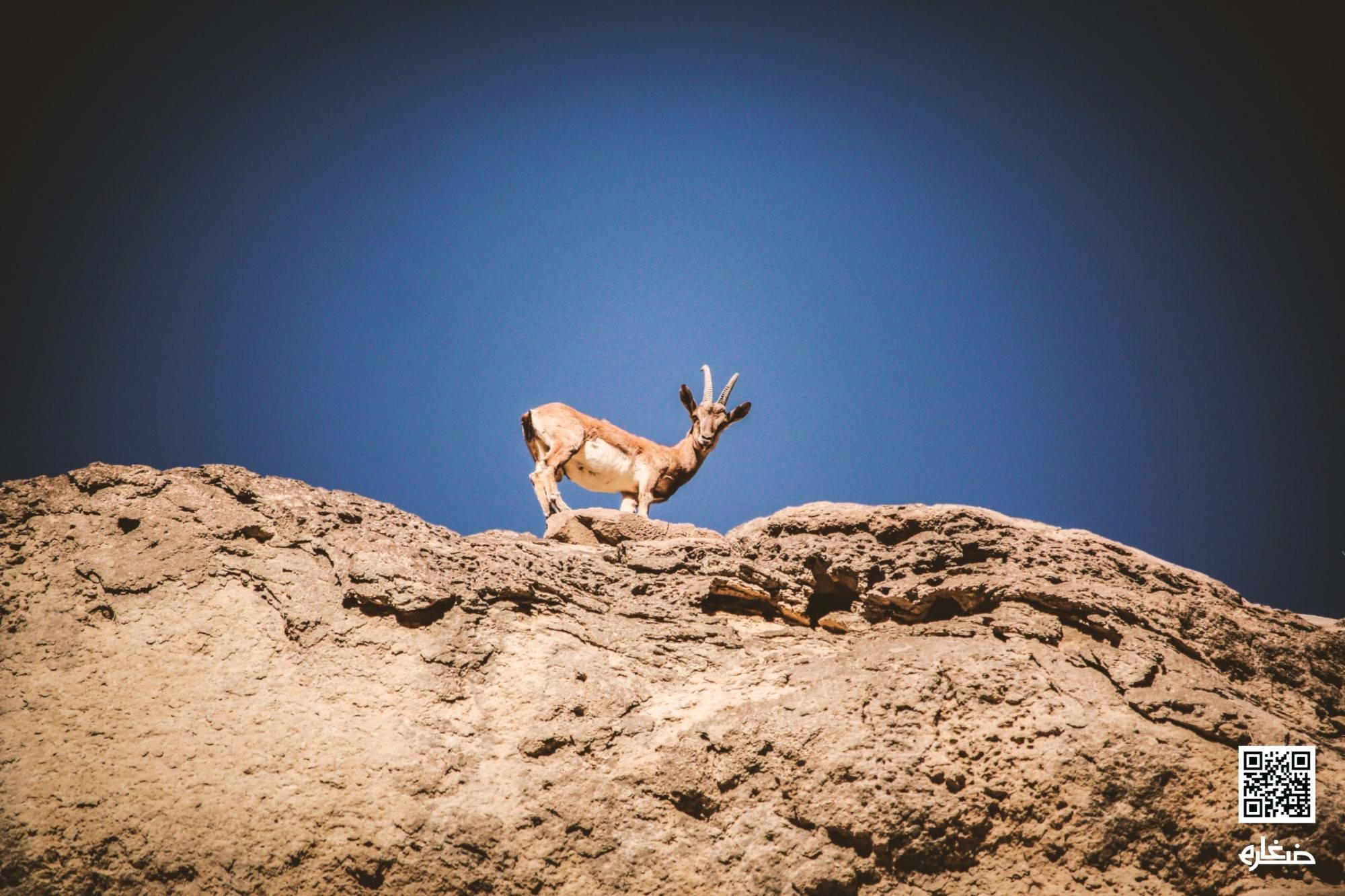
Female Sindh ibex at Hingol National Park

== Distribution and habitat ==
The present range of Sindh ibex includez the Kirthar mountains, which falls in the southern Sindh and southwestern Balochistan provinces, and the lowlands along the Makran Coastal Range. The population at Kirthar National Park is isolated from other groups present elsewhere. Surveys conducted between 2019 and 2022 found that Sindh ibex population in Khuzdar and Lasbela, including Hingol National Park, dropped from 720 in 2019 to 548 in 2022. According to another estimate, the total population of Sindh ibex had risen to 20,000 by 2022.
