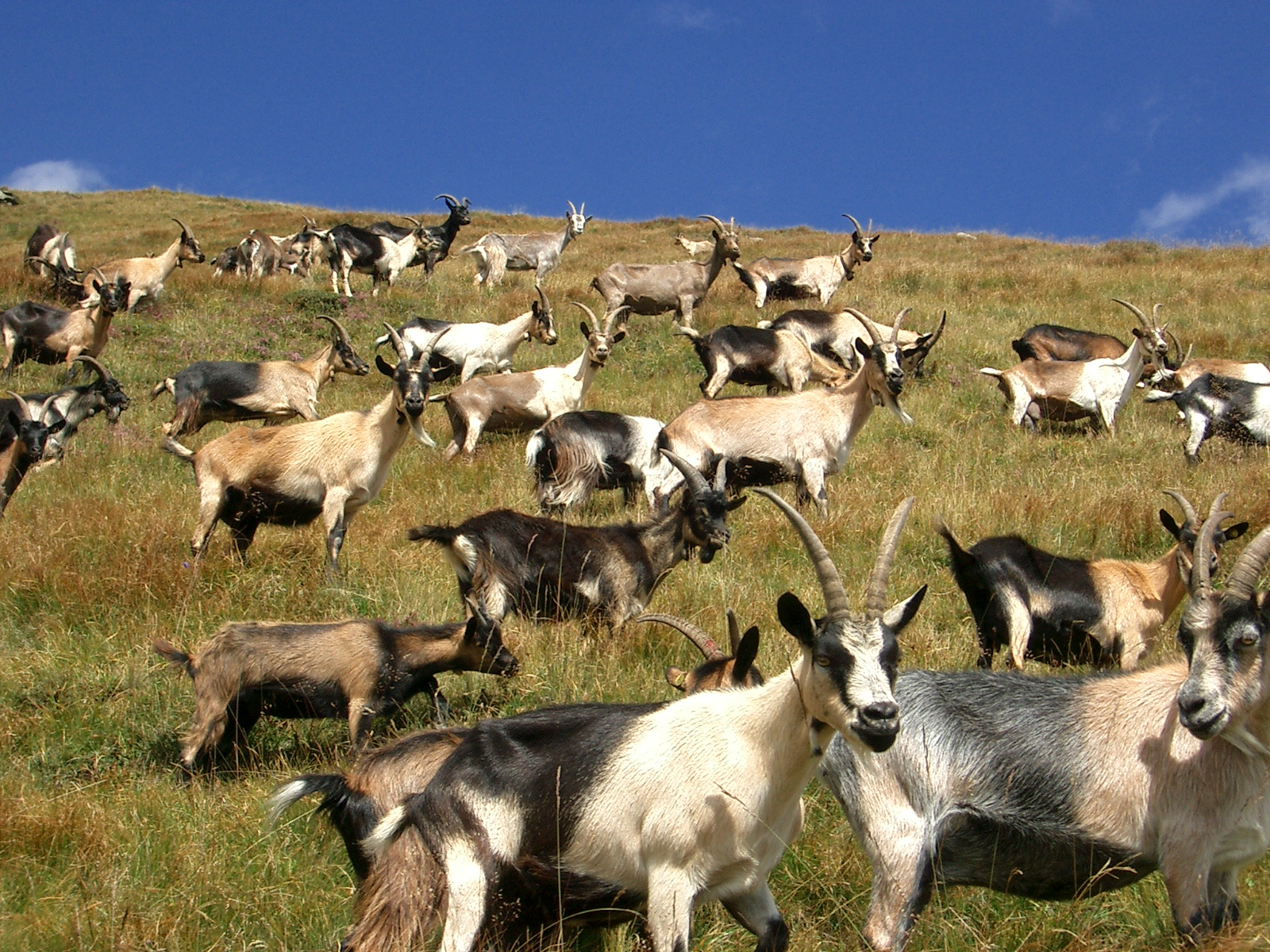
- Capra, St. Leonhard in Passeier, Italy

Scientific classification
- Kingdom: Animalia
- Phylum: Chordata
- Class: Mammalia
- Infraclass: Placentalia
- Order: Artiodactyla
- Family: Bovidae
- Subfamily: Caprinae
- Tribe: Caprini
- Genus: Capra; Linnaeus, 1758

Type species
- Capra hircus Linnaeus, 1758

Species
- See text.
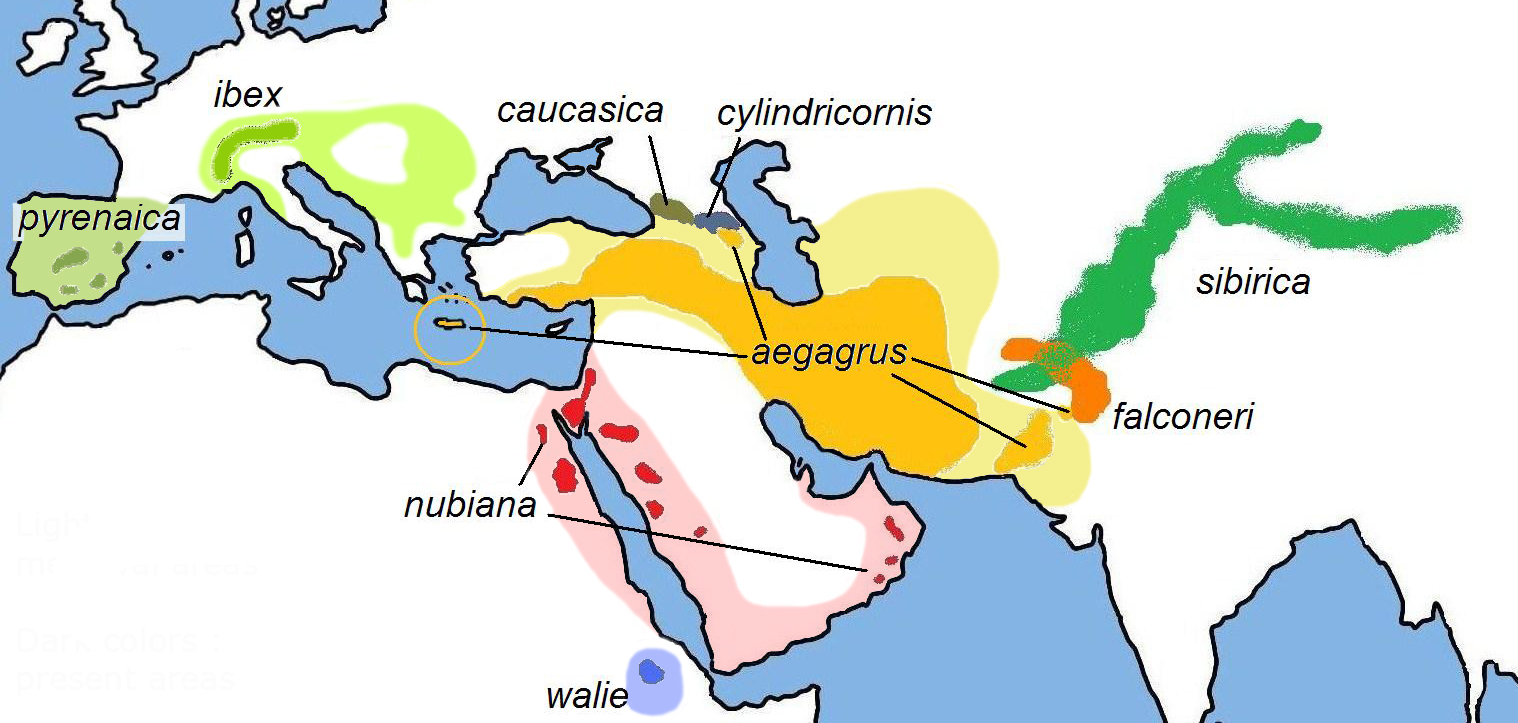
- Approximate range of the Capra species

= Capra (genus) =

Capra Temporal range: 2.58–0 Ma Early Pleistocene – Present

Genus of mammals, the goats

Capra is a genus of mammals, the goats, comprising ten species, including the markhor and several species known as ibexes. The domestic goat (Capra hircus) is a domesticated species derived from the bezoar ibex (Capra aegagrus aegagrus), a subspecies of the wild goat. It is one of the oldest domesticated species of animal—according to archaeological evidence its earliest domestication occurred in Iran at 10,000 calibrated calendar years ago.

Wild goats are animals of mountain habitats. They are very agile and hardy, able to climb on bare rock and survive on sparse vegetation. They can be distinguished from the genus Ovis, which includes sheep, by the presence of scent glands close to the feet, in the groin, and in front of the eyes, and the absence of other facial glands, and by the presence of a beard in some specimens, and of hairless calluses on the knees of the forelegs.

== Taxonomy ==
All members of the genus Capra are bovids (members of the family Bovidae), and more specifically caprines (subfamily Caprinae). As such they are ruminants, meaning they chew the cud, and have four-chambered stomachs which play a vital role in digesting, regurgitating, and redigesting their food.

The genus has sometimes been taken to include Ovis (sheep) and Ammotragus (Barbary sheep), but these are usually regarded as distinct genera, leaving Capra for ibexes. In this smaller genus, some authors have recognized only two species, the markhor on one side and all other forms included in one species on the other side. Today, nine wild species are usually accepted along with the domestic goat:

- West Asian ibex also known as the wild goat (Capra aegagrus)
  - Bezoar ibex (Capra aegagrus aegagrus)
  - Sindh ibex (Capra aegagrus blythi)
- Domestic goat (Capra hircus; includes feral goat; domesticated from C. aegagrus and sometimes considered a subspecies of it)
- Asian ibex also known as the Siberian ibex (Capra sibirica)
- Markhor (Capra falconeri)
- West Caucasian tur (Capra caucasica)
- East Caucasian tur (Capra cylindricornis)
- Alpine ibex (Capra ibex)
- Iberian ibex also known as the Spanish ibex (Capra pyrenaica)
- Nubian ibex (Capra nubiana)
- Walia ibex (Capra walie)

The goats of the genus Capra have complex systematic relationships, which are still not completely resolved. Recent studies based on mitochondrial DNA suggest that the Asian ibex and the Nubian ibex represent distinct species, which are not very closely related to the physically similar Alpine ibex. The Alpine ibex forms a group with the Iberian ibex. The West Caucasian tur appears to be more closely related to the wild goat than to the East Caucasian tur. The markhor is relatively little separated from other forms—previously it had been considered to be a separate branch of the genus.

The following cladogram of seven Capra species is based on 2022 mitochondrial evidence:

- Capra
  - Siberian ibex
  - - Nubian ibex
    - - Markhor
      - - - Domestic goat
          - Bezoar ibex
        - - Alpine ibex
          - Iberian ibex

Almost all wild goat species are allopatric (geographically separated)—the only geographical overlaps are the wild goat (Capra aegagrus) with the East Caucasian tur (Capra cylindricornis), and the markhor (Capra falconeri) with the Asian ibex (Capra sibirica). In both cases, the overlapping species do not usually interbreed in the wild, but in captivity, all Capra species can interbreed, producing fertile offspring.

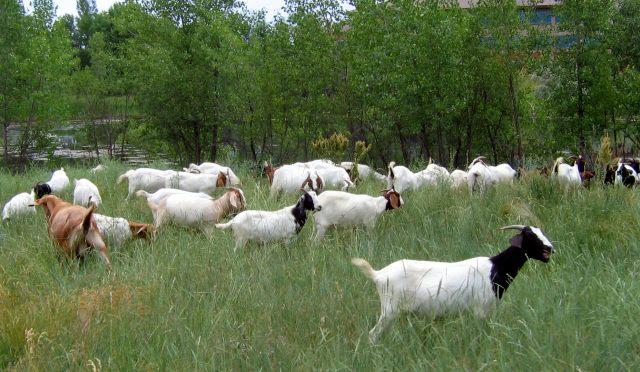
Goats used for natural weed control

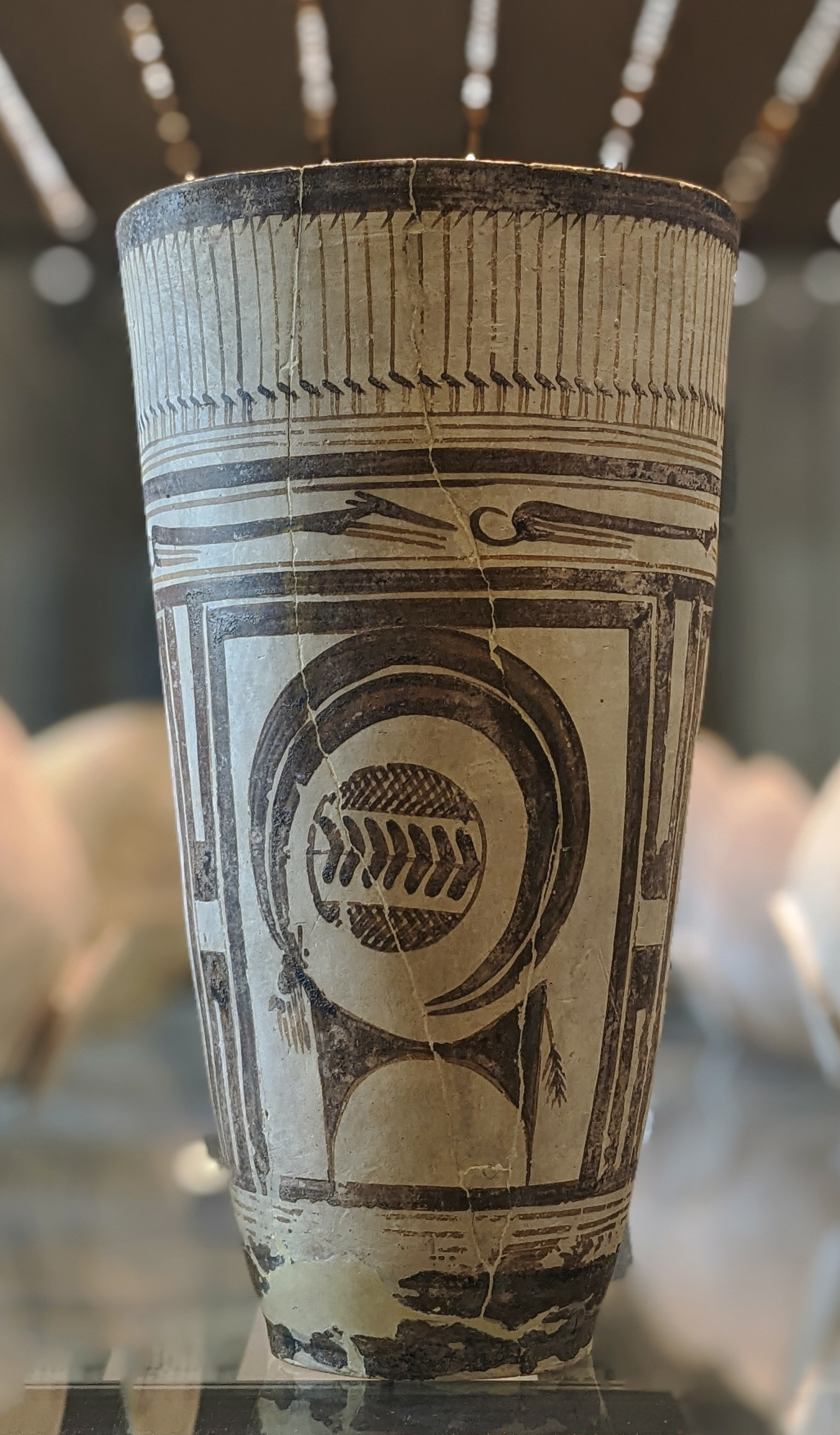
Prehistoric terracotta pottery from Susa depicting an ibex, c. 4200–3500 BC

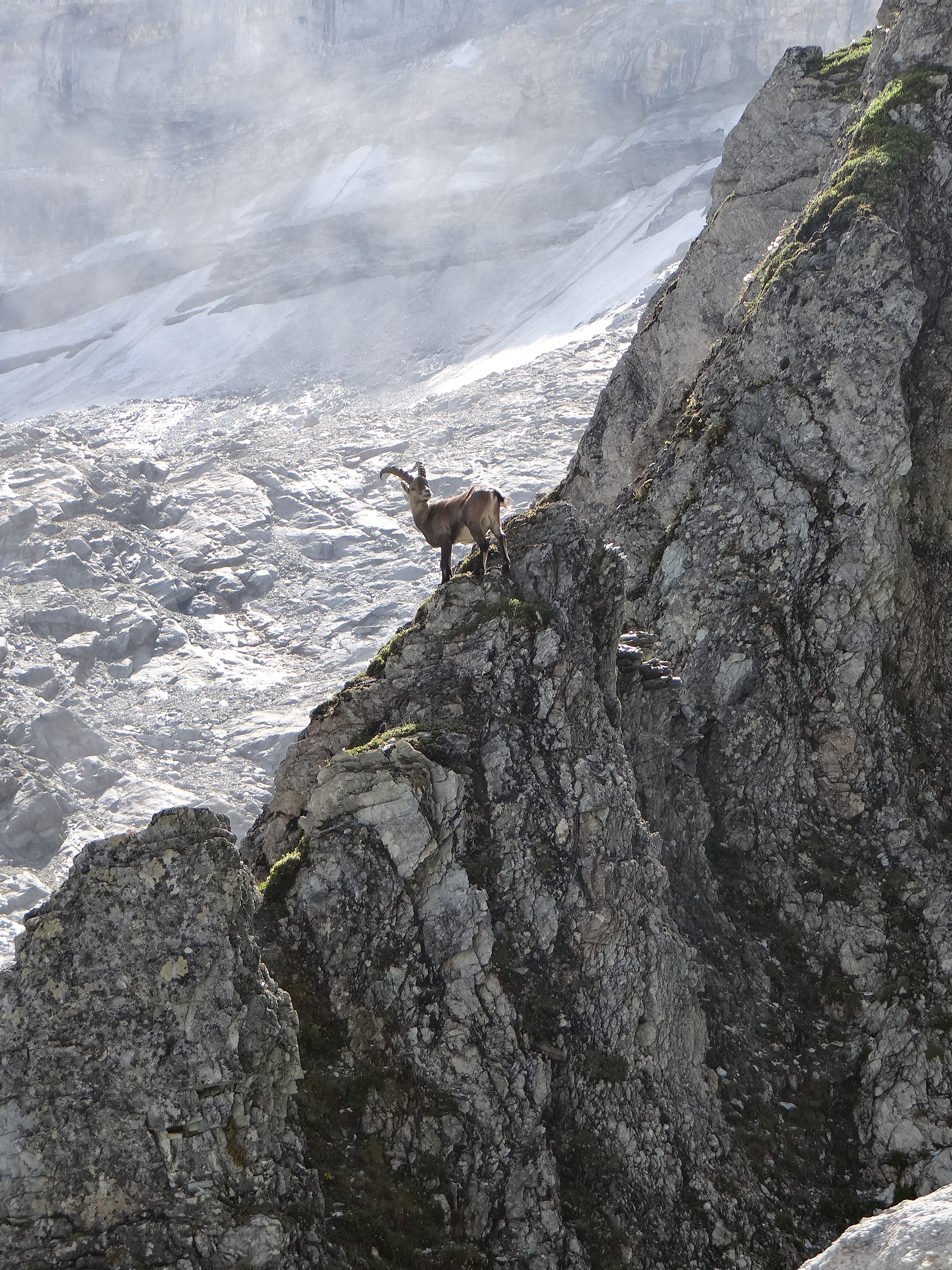
Ibex securely climbing rocky slope

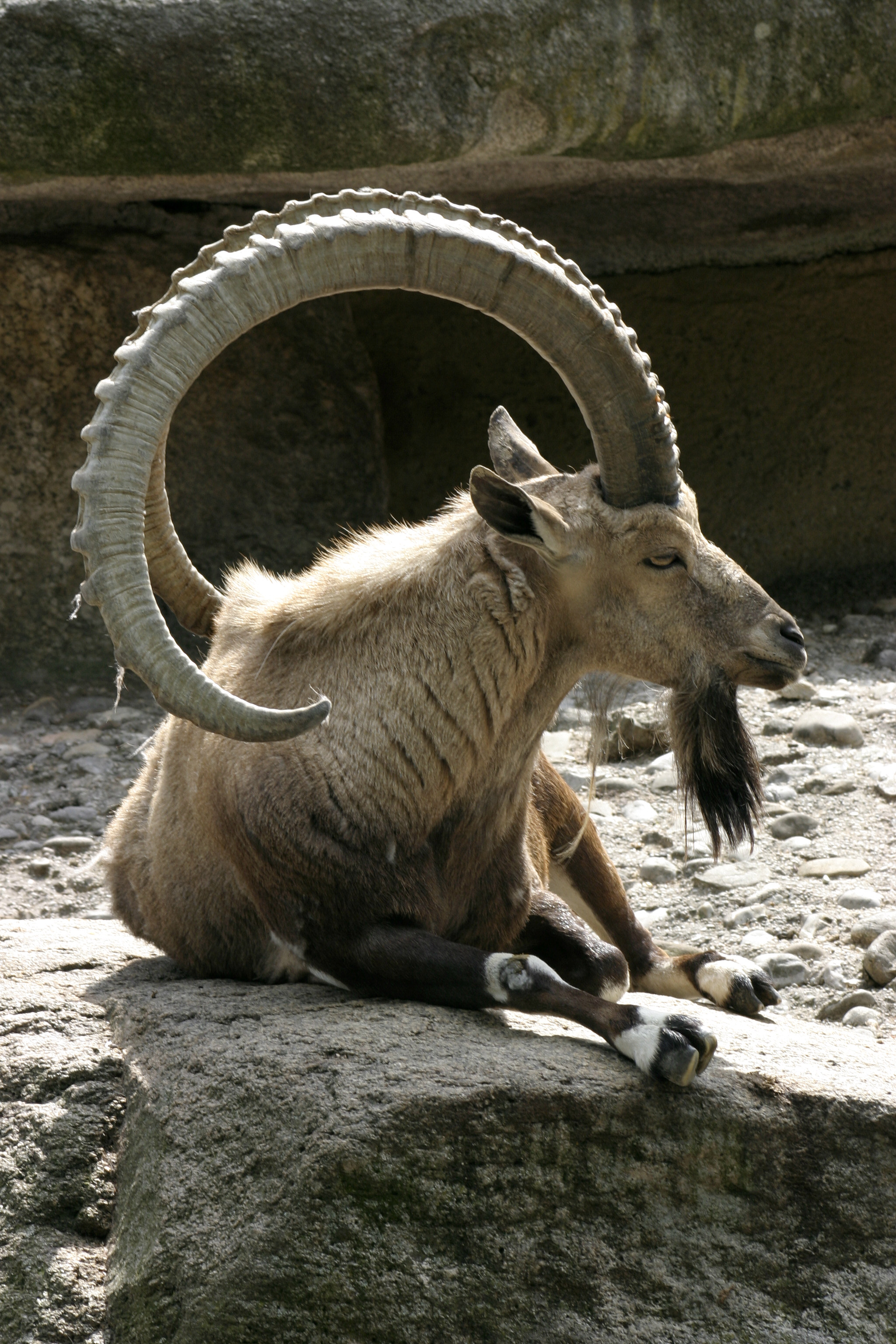
Male Nubian ibex

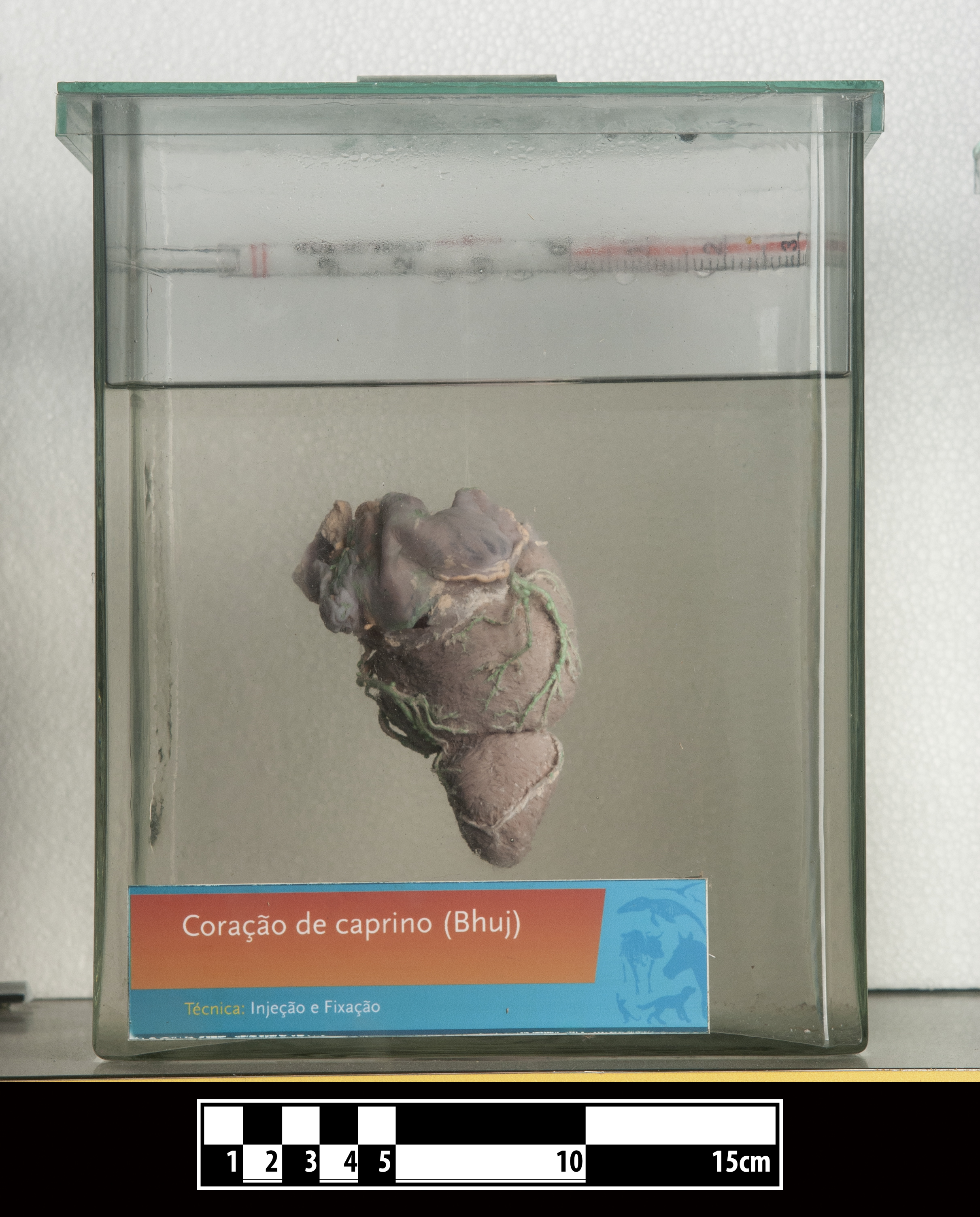
Caprine heart

== Species and subspecies ==
Genus Capra – Linnaeus, 1758 – ten species
| Common name | Scientific name and subspecies | Range | Size and ecology | IUCN status and estimated population |
|---|---|---|---|---|
| Asian ibex, Siberian ibex | Capra sibirica Pallas, 1776 Four subspecies: C. s. sibirica; C. s. alaiana; C. s. hagenbecki; C. s. sakeen | Central & North Asia, Afghanistan, West and North China (mainly Xinjiang), NW India, SE Kazakhstan, Kyrgyzstan, Mongolia, North Pakistan, South Russia, Tajikistan, East Uzbekistan. | Size: Habitat: Diet: | NT |
| Markhor | Capra falconeri (Wagner, 1839) Five subspecies: C. f. falconeri; C. f. heptneri; C. f. megaceros; C. f. cashmiriensis; C. f. jerdoni | South Asia; the Karakoram and Himalaya ranges. | Size: Habitat: Diet: | NT |
| Domestic goat | Capra hircus Linnaeus, 1758 | Cosmopolitan distribution; domesticated. | Size: Habitat: Diet: | LC |
| Wild goat | Capra aegagrus Erxleben, 1777 Four subspecies: Bezoar ibex C. a. aegagrus; Sindh ibex C. a. blythi; Chiltan ibex C. a. chialtanensis; Turkmen wild goat C. a. turcmenica | Turkey, the Caucasus to Turkmenistan, Afghanistan and Pakistan | Size: Habitat: Diet: | NT |
| East Caucasian tur | Capra cylindricornis (Blyth, 1841) | Greater Caucasus Mountains. | Size: Habitat: Diet: | NT |
| West Caucasian tur | Capra caucasica Güldenstädt and Pallas, 1783 | Caucasus Mountains. | Size: Habitat: Diet: | EN |
| Alpine ibex | Capra ibex Linnaeus, 1758 | Austria, Bavaria, France, Italy, Liechtenstein, Slovenia & Switzerland. | Size: Habitat: Diet: | LC |
| Iberian ibex | Capra pyrenaica (Schinz, 1838) Four subspecies: Capra pyrenaica hispanica; Capra pyrenaica victoriae; †Capra pyrenaica lusitanica; †Capra pyrenaica pyrenaica | Iberian Peninsula: Andorra, Pyrenees Mountains, Spain to Portugal. | Size: Habitat: Diet: | LC |
| Nubian ibex | Capra nubiana F. Cuvier, 1825 | Egypt, Eritrea, Ethiopia, Israel, Jordan, Lebanon, Oman, Palestine, Saudi Arabia, Sudan, United Arab Emirates and Yemen. | Size: Males: 52–74.7 kg (115–165 lb) Females: 25.3–32.7 kg (56–72 lb) Habitat: Mountainous desert terrain near water sources Diet: Acacia and other trees, shrubs, and grasses | VU 4,500 |
| Walia ibex | Capra walie Rüppell, 1835 | Ethiopian Highlands & Simien Mountains. | Size: Habitat: Diet: | VU |

== Domestication and uses ==
Along with sheep, goats were among the first domesticated animals. The domestication process started at least 10,000 years ago in what is now northern Iran. Easy human access to goat hair, meat, and milk were the primary motivations. Goat skins were popularly used until the Middle Ages for water and wine bottles when traveling and camping, and in certain regions as parchment for writing.

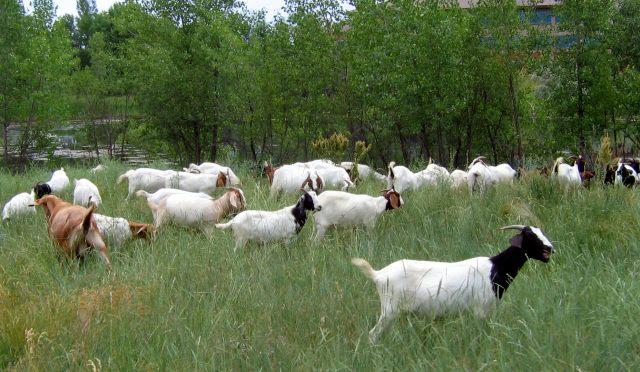
Goats used for natural weed control
