= Cingino Dam =

Dam in Piedmont, Italy

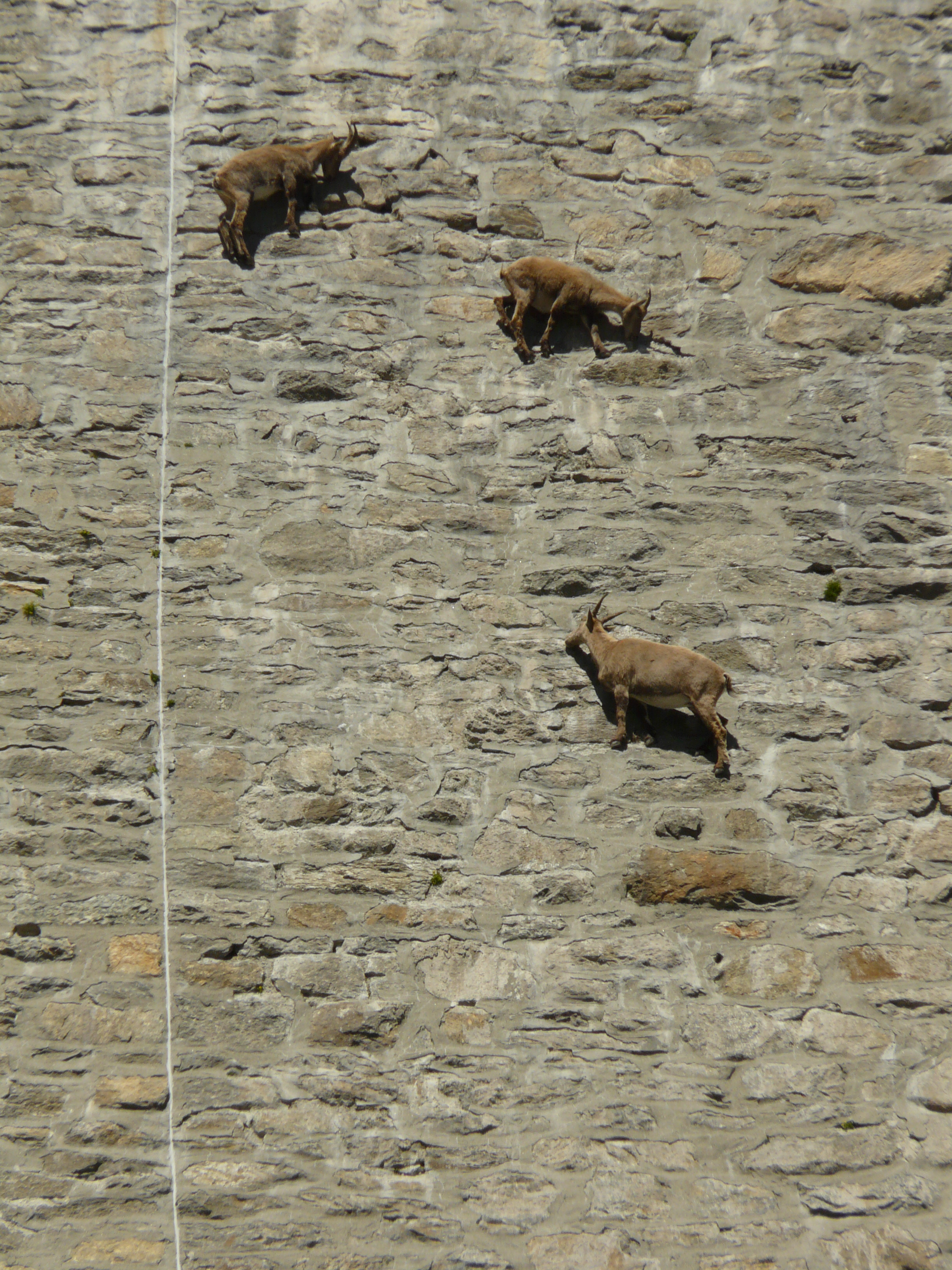
- Alpine Ibex goats on the wall

- Location within Italy
- Official name: Diga del Cingino
- Country: Italy
- Location: Antrona Schieranco, Province of Verbano-Cusio-Ossola, Piedmont
- Coordinates: 46°1′49″N 8°2′17″E
- Construction began: 1925
- Opening date: 1930

Dam and spillways
- Type of dam: Gravity, masonry
- Height: 46 metres (151 ft) (by D.L. 08/08/1994 definition); 51 metres (167 ft) (by D.M. 24/03/1982 definition)
- Width (crest): 152 metres (499 ft)

The Cingino Dam is a gravity masonry dam located 7 kilometres (4 mi) southwest of Antrona Schieranco, Valle Antrona, Province of Verbano-Cusio-Ossola in Piedmont, Italy. The dam creates Lago Cingino (or Cingino reservoir) which is fed by the Antigine and Troncone streams. The reservoir has a surface area of 0.14 square kilometres (0.1 mi^{2}) and is maximum 2,262 metres (7,421 ft) above sea level, typically 2,250 metres (7,382 ft). It is one of five reservoirs within a hydroelectric complex in the Valle Antrona and helps supply the Campliccioli Power Plant with water for power production.

The dam became an internet sensation due to pictures of Alpine Ibex that climb up its steep downstream face in order to lick salt off the stones. A video shared by the BBC's Forces of Nature with Brian Cox has been viewed over 208 million times as of May 2022. Despite the picturesque setting, Atlas Obscura describes the dam as "otherwise unremarkable."
