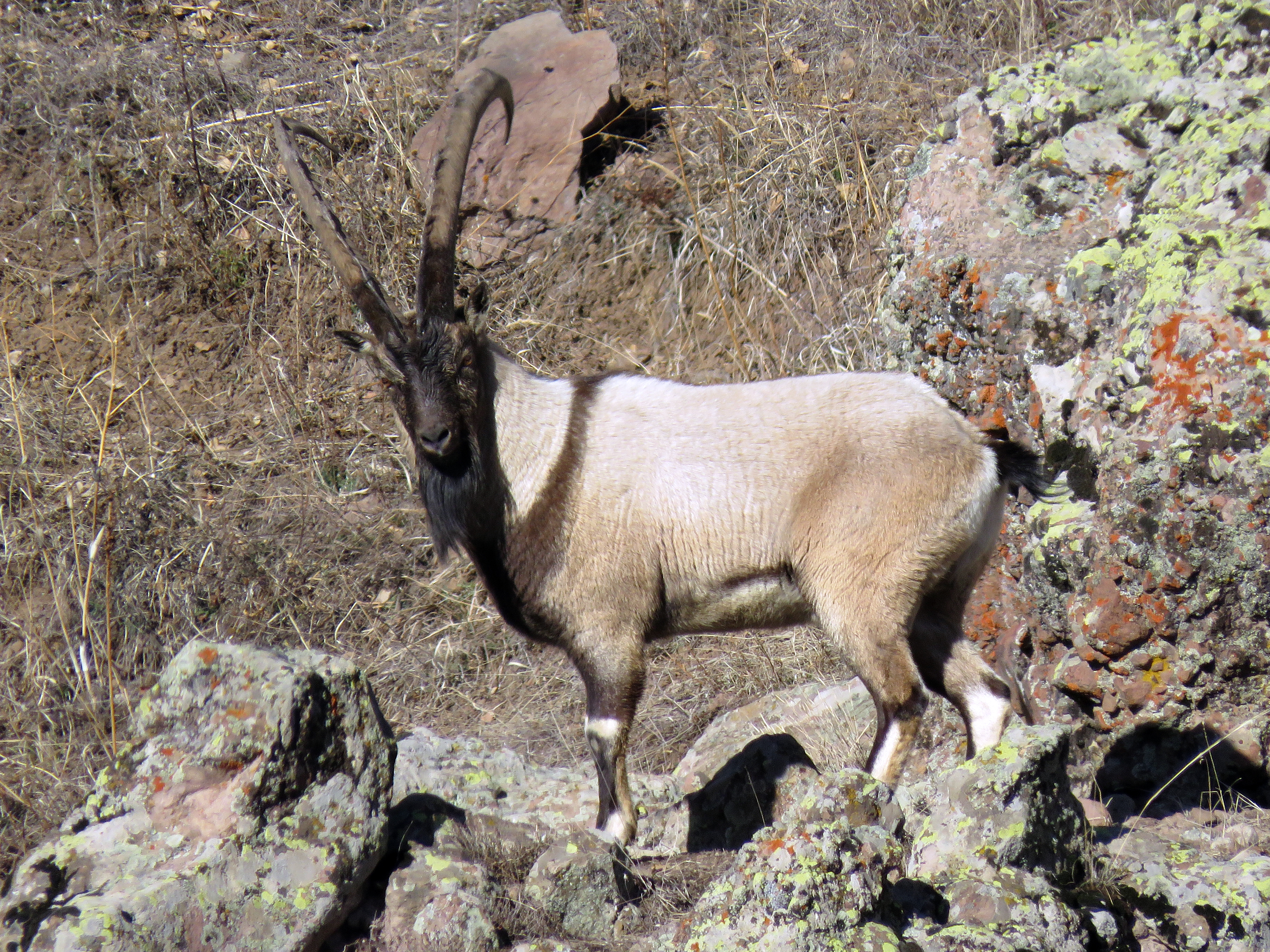
- Bezoar ibex, Capra aegagrus aegagrus

Conservation status
- Near Threatened (IUCN 3.1)
- CITES Appendix III

Scientific classification
- Kingdom: Animalia
- Phylum: Chordata
- Class: Mammalia
- Order: Artiodactyla
- Family: Bovidae
- Subfamily: Caprinae
- Genus: Capra
- Species: C. aegagrus

Binomial name
- Capra aegagrus Erxleben, 1777

Subspecies
- Capra aegagrus aegagrus Capra aegagrus blythi Capra aegagrus chialtanensis Capra aegagrus turcmenica

= Wild goat =

Wild goat Temporal range: 2.58–0 Ma Pleistocene - Recent

Species of mammal

The wild goat (Capra aegagrus) is a goat species, inhabiting forests, shrublands and rocky areas ranging from Turkey and the Caucasus in the west to Iran, Turkmenistan, Afghanistan, and Pakistan in the east. It has been listed as near threatened on the IUCN Red List and is threatened by habitat destruction and degradation.

It is thought to be the ancestor of the domestic goat (C. hircus).

== Taxonomy ==
Capra aegagrus was the first scientific name proposed by Johann Christian Polycarp Erxleben in 1777 for the wild goat populations of the Caucasus and Taurus Mountains. Capra blythi proposed by Allan Octavian Hume in 1874 was given to wild goat horns found in Sindh.

Both the Bezoar ibex (C. a. aegagrus) and the Sindh ibex (C. a. blythi) are considered to be valid wild goat subspecies. There is debate as to whether or not the Chiltan ibex (C. a. chialtanensis). Though it was initially thought to be a distinct subspecies, it is now considered a variant of the wild goat, with some scientists suggesting it may be a hybrid with markhor.

The Cretan goat, formerly C. a. pictus, or kri-kri, was once thought to be a subspecies of wild goat, but is now considered to be a feral goat (Capra hircus), now known as Capra hircus cretica.

== Distribution and habitat ==
Wild goat kid in Borjomi-Kharagauli National Park

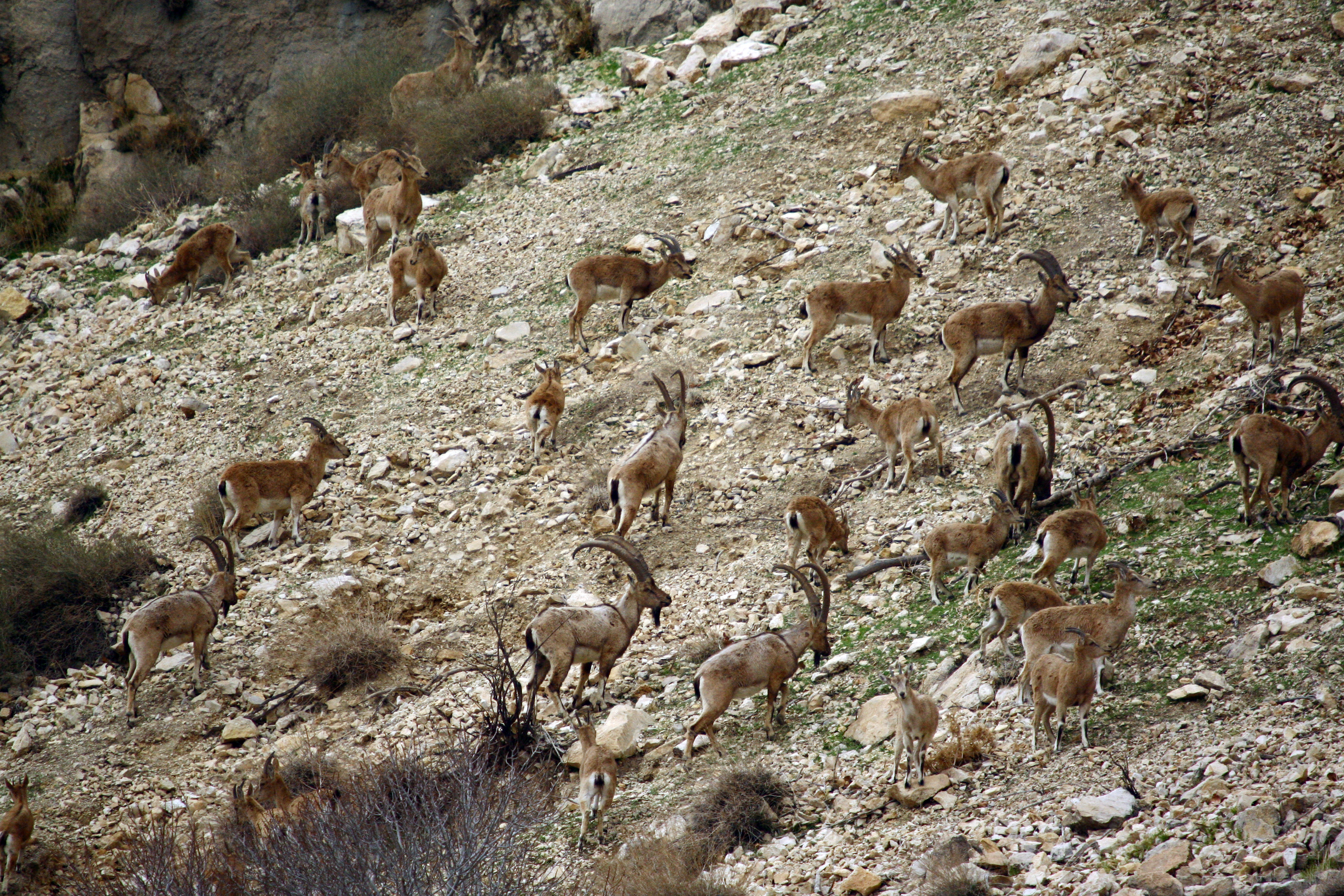
Wild goat herd in Behbahan

In Turkey, the wild goat occurs in the Aegean, Mediterranean, Black Sea, Southeastern and the Eastern Anatolia regions up to 3,250 m (10,660 ft) in the Taurus and Anti-Taurus Mountains.

In the Caucasus, it inhabits montane forests in the river basins of Andi Koysu and its tributaries in Dagestan, Chechnya and Georgia up to 2,700 m (8,900 ft).

In Armenia, wild goats were recorded in the Zangezur Mountains, in Khosrov State Reserve, and in highlands of the Syunik Province during field surveys from 2006 to 2007. In Azerbaijan, wild goats occur in Ordubad National Park, Daralayaz and Murovdag mountain areas in Nakhchivan Autonomous Republic. In Iran's Haftad Gholleh Protected Area, wild goat herds live foremost in west-facing areas with rocky substrates, water sources and steep slopes that are far from roads. In Turkmenistan, wild goat populations inhabit the mountain ranges of Uly Balkan and Kopet Dag. In Pakistan, wild goat herds occur in Kirthar National Park.

== Behaviour and ecology ==
In Kirthar National Park, 283 wild goat groups were observed for 10 months in 1986. The group sizes ranged from two to 131 individuals but varied seasonally, with a mean ratio of two females per male.

In Dagestan, male wild goats start courting females in mid December. The rutting season lasts until the third week of January. Females give birth to between one and three kids in late June to mid July.

Older males drive younger males from the maternal herds. The gestation period averages 170 days. Kids are mobile almost immediately after birth. Kids are weaned after 6 months. Female goats reach sexual maturity at 1½–2½ years, males at 3½–4 years. The lifespan of a goat can be from 12 to 22 years.

== Threats ==
Wild goat populations are threatened foremost by poaching, habitat loss due to logging, and competition with domestic livestock for food resources.

== See also ==
- Feral goat
- Mountain goat
