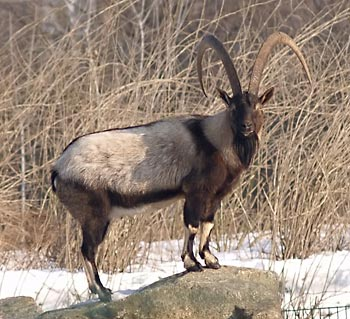
- Bezoar ibex, Capra aegagrus aegagrus

Scientific classification
- Kingdom: Animalia
- Phylum: Chordata
- Class: Mammalia
- Order: Artiodactyla
- Family: Bovidae
- Subfamily: Caprinae
- Genus: Capra
- Species: C. aegagrus
- Subspecies: C. a. aegagrus

Trinomial name
- Capra aegagrus aegagrus Erxleben, 1777
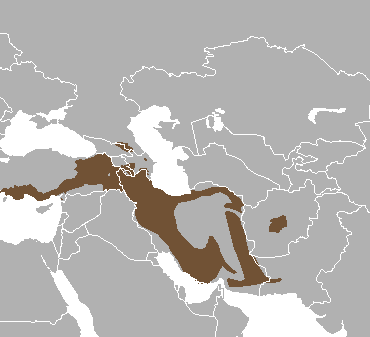

= Bezoar ibex =

Subspecies of goat

The bezoar ibex (Capra aegagrus aegagrus) is a wild goat subspecies that is native to the montane forested areas in the Anatolia, Caucasus and the Zagros Mountains.

== Description ==
The male bezoar ibex, which weighs around 60 kg (130 lb), is known particularly for the size of its horns; it possesses the world's longest horns in relation to body weight, and can exceed 1.4 m (4 ft 7 in) high; those in the southern and eastern desert ranges are typically smaller by 30 percent. Females are slightly smaller and their horns tend to grow to 0.2 m (7.9 in). Males have a dark brown summer coat, while the females have a more reddish-gold, and both sexes shift to a gray-colored coat in winter. Both sexes also have a tuft of hair extending from the chin. The ibexes have a black stripe from the spine that extends over the shoulder, limbs, and neck. This stripe darkens in the mating season.

== Distribution and habitat ==
In Turkey, the bezoar ibex is distributed from the southern Aegean coast to the Taurus and Anti-Taurus Mountains into steep areas of southeastern Anatolia, much of eastern Anatolia and the Pontic Alps. In the Greater Caucasus, it ranges from the upper Argun river in Georgia to Chechnya, in the Andi Koisu and Avar Koisu river basins in Daghestan and Tusheti up to the headwaters of the Jurmut river. In the Lesser Caucasus, it occurs in the mountain ranges in Azerbaijan and Armenia, including the Zangezur Mountains, Meghri, Mrovdagh, Karabakh and Delidagh ranges. In Iran, it is widely distributed and lives in rocky terrain, mountainous areas, on cliffs along the seashore, deciduous forests and in some areas in the Dasht-e Kavir desert. In Iraq, it occurs in the Zagros Mountains along the borders with Turkey and Iran.

=== Introduced ===
The goat populations on some Aegean islands and in Crete were introduced during the prehistoric period and constitute relict populations of the domestic goat (Capra hircus) that are now feral. The bezoar ibex is one of the domestic goat's progenitors. Wild goats are thought to have been domesticated at least 10,000 years Before Present. In the United States, bezoar ibex were introduced to the Florida mountains in New Mexico in 1970. Initially only 15 were imported from Iran but in 1974 an additional 27 were released, leading to a self-sustaining population.

== Hybridization ==
The hybrid ibex is a cross between a wild bezoar ibex and a domestic goat. It occurs in several localities in one district of Turkey and crosses over habitats with the bezoar in some of these areas. Hybrids tend to be very similar to the bezoar ibex, but have much longer, floppier ears and a longer coat. The most prominent difference may be the horns, which flare out significantly in comparison to those of a true ibex.
