= Feral goat =

Domestic goat established in the wild

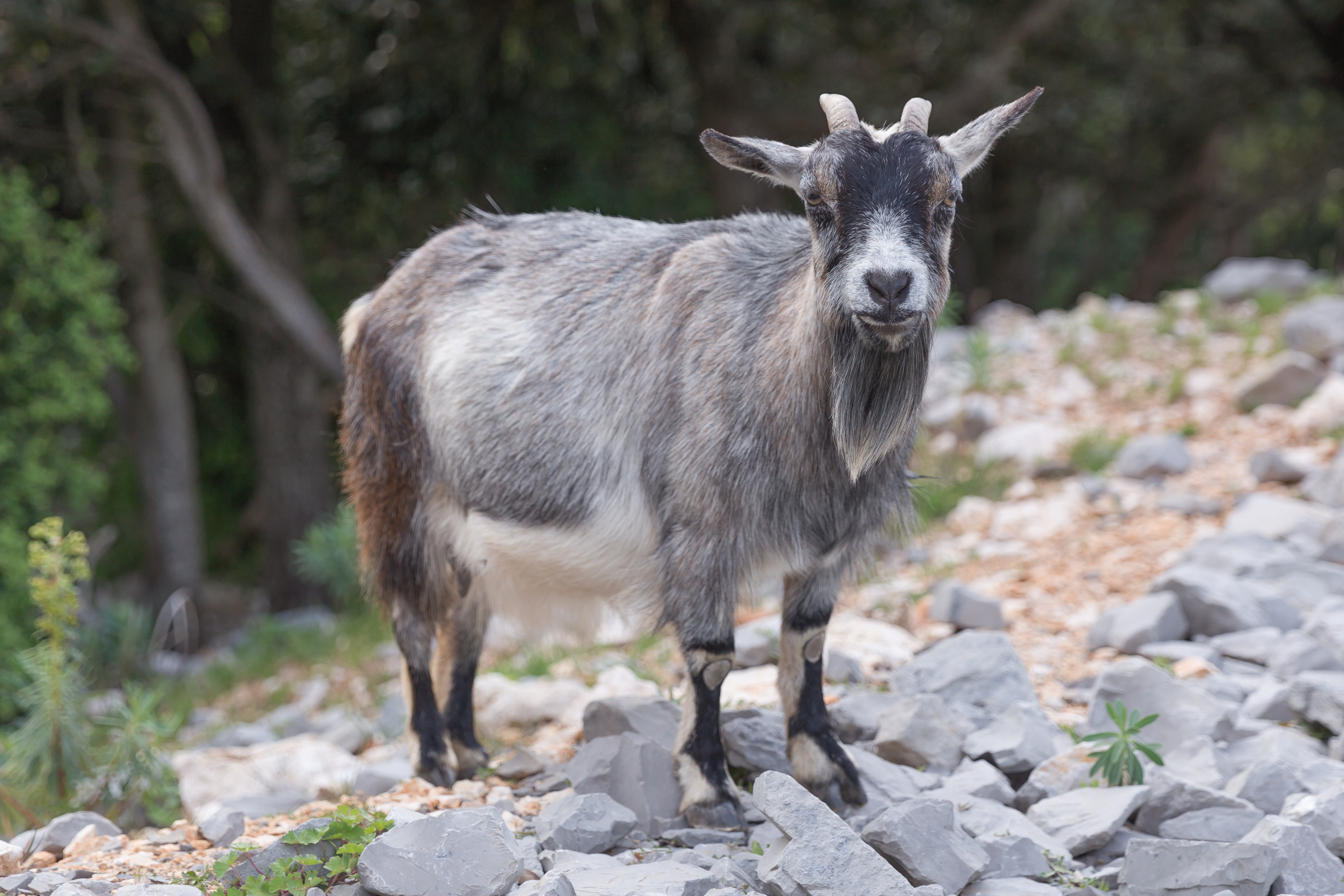
A feral goat in Ardèche in southeastern France

The feral goat is the domestic goat (Capra hircus) when it has become established in the wild. Feral goats occur in many parts of the world. Goats are famously adaptable, and are content to live in rough, hilly terrain that humans and other animals find difficult to traverse.

== Species ==
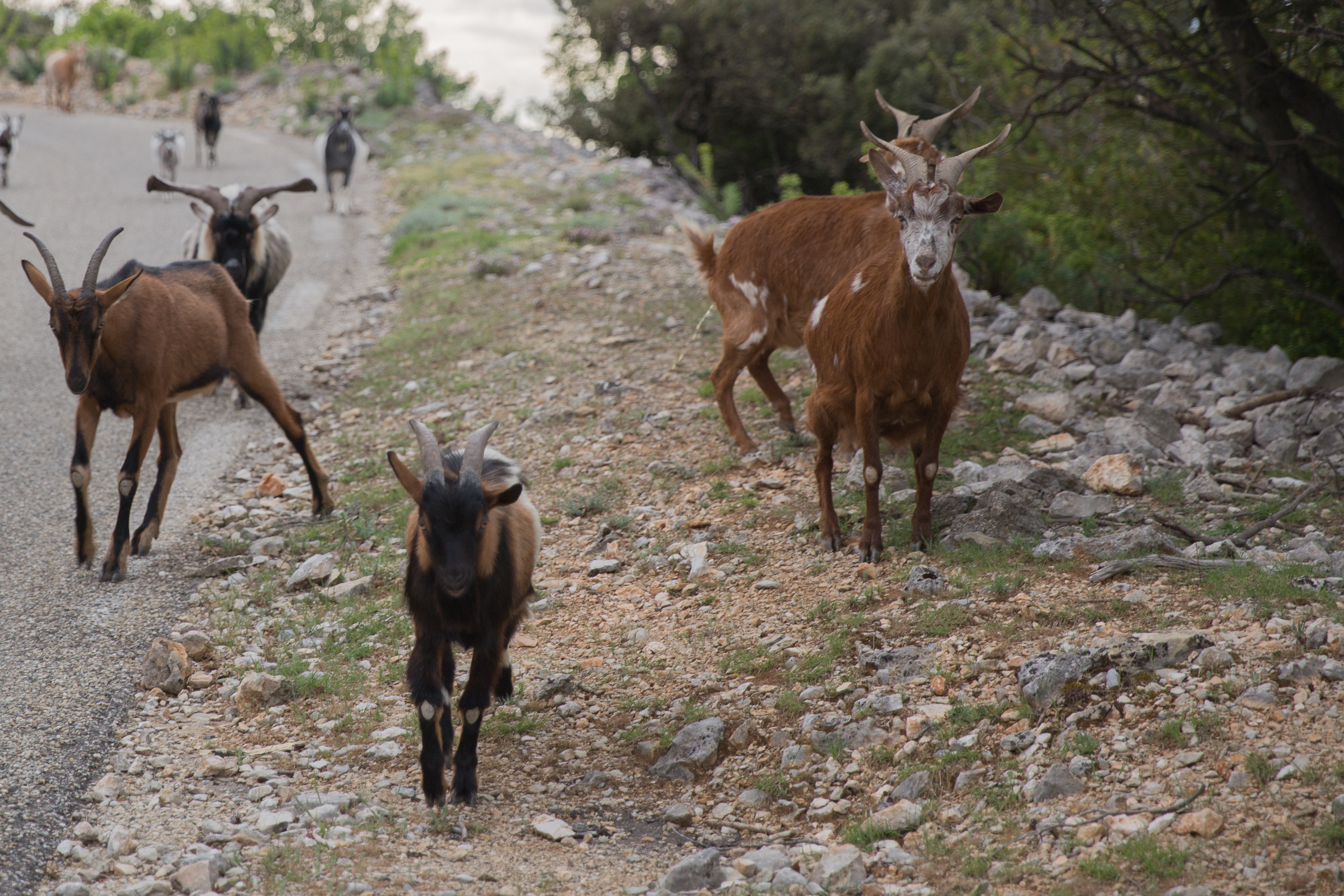
Feral goats in Ardèche in southeastern France

Feral goats consist of many breeds of domestic goats, all of which stem from the wild goat (C. aegagrus). Although breeds can look different, they all share similar characteristics. Physically, both domestic and feral goats can be identified by their prominent straight horns (more prominent on male goats), rectangular pupils, and coarse hair. In addition, most domestic goats/feral goats weigh around 100–120 pounds (45–55 kg). Goats heavier than that are likely wild goats, not domestic goats gone feral.

== Behavior ==
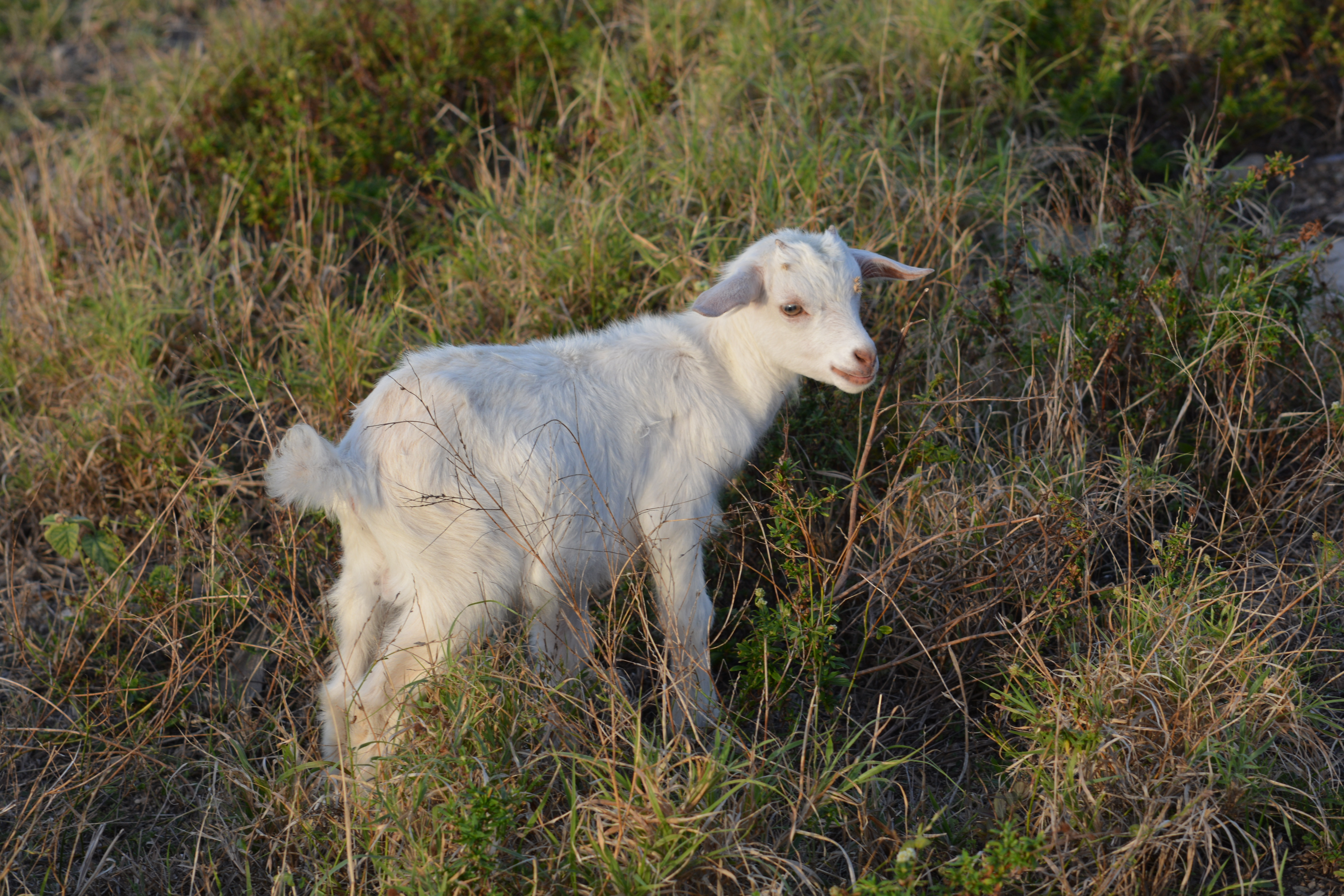
A feral goat kid at Abrolhos Marine National Park in Brazil

The feral goat is seen in Australia, New Zealand, Great Britain, Ireland, Hawaii, Brazil, Honduras, Lebanon, Panama, Madagascar, the Comoros, Mauritius, Réunion, New Guinea, the Galápagos Islands, Cuba, and in many other parts of the world. When feral goats reach large populations in habitats which are not adapted to them, they may become an invasive species with serious negative effects, such as removing native scrub, trees, and other vegetation. Feral goats are included in the 100 of the World's Worst Invasive Alien Species.

However, in other circumstances they may become a natural component of the habitat, even replacing locally extinct wild goats.

Goats are sometimes used for conservation grazing, to control the spread of undesirable scrub or weeds. While this is usually tracked with domesticated goats, in theory feral goats can be used for this as well in habitats such as chalk grassland and heathland.

=== Diet ===
Goats are herbivores whose diet consists of plant materials such as trees, shrubs, and grasses. Due to their stomachs, which are four-chambered, goats have the capacity to eat many plants that are typically toxic to other animals. Capeweed, for example, is toxic to most animals due to the presence of high nitrate levels. However, goats have the capacity to process these chemicals and eat capeweed with little issue. Though goats' stomachs are incredibly durable, some materials still remain deadly to goats and goats will seldom eat these materials. Molds, for example, are still highly toxic for goats and have the capacity to kill a goat if consumed. Nightshades and wilted fruit trees are also toxic to goats and any presence of Listeria bacteria can prove fatal to goats as they are incredibly susceptible to the bacteria. Outside of plant materials, goats have also been seen attempting to eat nearly any object that they are curious about as well. Notably, goats have been seen eating litter such as tin cans and cardboard and although their stomachs can process the material, they get no nutritional value from it and should still be eating plant materials.

=== Predators ===
Having a wide habitat range, goats also have a wide array of predators. Canine species are particularly impactful predators of goats. These include coyotes, wolves, foxes and dingoes. In addition to these species, other animals such as bobcats and birds of prey, such as eagles, have been noted to hunt, kill and eat feral goats.

== Feral goats throughout the world ==
=== Australia ===
Feral goats are common in Australia, especially in New South Wales where they are estimated at between 4–5 million in just one province. They have become a threat and a pest since the 20th century.

=== England ===
Around 5,000 BP non-native goats, also known as British primitive goats, were brought to Great Britain as domestic stock, bred for milk and meat. Today, the goat species Capra hircus is still present in the country with a total population of 5,000–10,000 individuals. The number of goats are constantly changing due to management, conservation, reproduction, and removal. This invasive goat species is destructive to the natural habitat and therefore means of removal are available. One way these goats are managed is through hunting. In England they do not have a closed season for goat hunting, and thus goats are able to be hunted year-round.

=== Ireland ===
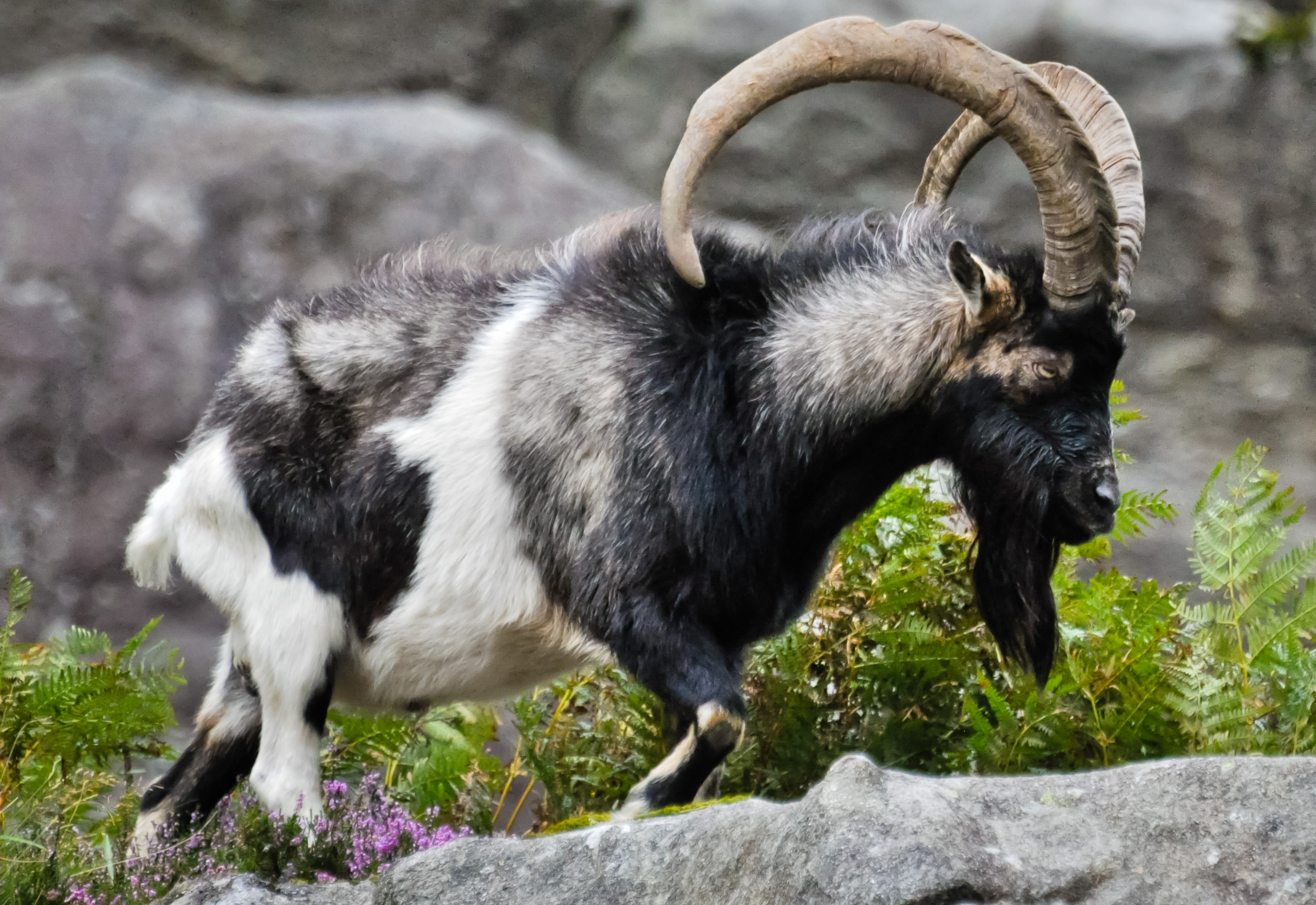
A feral Irish goat in Glendalough in Ireland

Goats were brought to Ireland over 4,000 years ago for their meat, milk, and hair. Feral goats are typically found in mountainous regions of Ireland and have no known predators, not even humans. Feral goats are common in many areas of the Irish west coast including Counties Mayo, Donegal, and Kerry. There are about 5,000 goats in Ireland, and though they are not formally protected, they are often ignored by humans and not typically hunted. They are destructive when it comes to native species because they mainly eat grass, shrubs, and young trees, but as of now there is no plan to eradicate them from the country.

=== Majorca ===
Majorca or Mallorca is an island in the Balearic Islands, which are a part of Spain and located in the Mediterranean Sea. These feral goats, also known as Balearen bocs, were introduced by humans between 2300 and 2050 BC. They were originally used as a food source but eventually they began being a threat to domestic goats and native tree species. The biggest threat to their conservation is hybridization with current domestic goats, but both are the same species (Capra hircus). These populations threaten the growth of new trees in several forests on the island, especially oak forests.

=== New Zealand ===
Three goat breeds have been known to exist within New Zealand, namely the Arapawa goat, the Auckland Island goat and the New Zealand goat. Out of the three, the Arapawa goat's populations are too small for it to be any threat at all to the Arapaoa Island that it resides on, with them today being noted to be critically endangered.

The Auckland Island goat was introduced in the 19th century to serve as a food source for castaways on the Auckland Island. Although about 100 goats were observed to have lived on the island at the time, this population managed to do considerable damage to the island's ecosystem. As a result, the goat population was located and dealt with accordingly. About 60 goats were exported off the island for domestication in 1992 and the remaining population was killed off. As of 1999, the Auckland Island goat has been considered extinct.

The last breed, the New Zealand goat, were brought onto the North and South Islands in 1773 by early explorers, whalers, sealers and settlers who brought goats with them for food and bartering. Over time, more goats were brought in for a variety of purposes, from livestock to the handling of other invasive plant species. This problem culminated in 14% of New Zealand now being populated by feral goats, all of which have begun to destroy the natural florae of the islands. Currently, hunting and training Judas goats are the primary means of handling the threat, but this has not done much to stop the goats and they still remain a threat.

=== Scotland ===
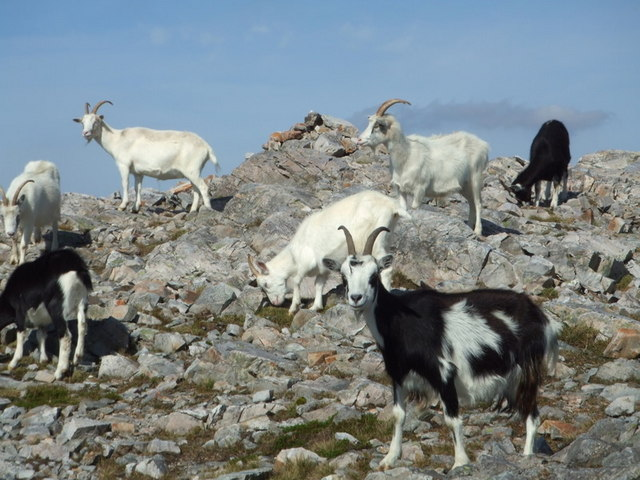
Feral goats grazing at the summit of Sgorr nam Fiannaidh on Aonach Eagach ridge in Scotland

The feral goats of Scotland were brought in by Neolithic-era humans for farming purposes but were likely abandoned around the late 1700s due to the Highland Clearances, the evictions of a significant number of tenants in the Scottish Highlands and Islands. These people were unable to bring their livestock with them and, instead, had to leave them to roam the Highlands. The goats from this collective of livestock were able to get a foothold in this environment however and within little time, the population of Highland goats exploded to about 3,000 to 4,000. Though they are very common to see, they are also heavily considered both a nonnative, invasive species by the Scottish government as well as a major threat to the Scottish Highlands with there being evidence of the goats contributing to grazing pressures on at least 18 different conservational sites. Hunting remains as one of the primary ways that the population is handled and though a few population management plans have been discussed, few have gotten off of the ground.

=== United States ===
One of the most acute United States feral goat issues arose on San Clemente Island off the coast of southern California. The goats were first introduced onto the island as of 1875 from another nearby island, Santa Catalina Island, and had not been properly managed since, allowing their population to spike up to about 15,000. This population had begun to damage the natural ecosystem of the island, destroying crops and other plant life as well as interfering with the animals that had used said plants as a food source. The United States Navy, being the owners of the island as of 1934, allowed hunting and trapping of these goats until 1972 when it was determined that this had not made a dent in the goat population. An official culling program had to be organized to properly exterminate the goats.

Fund for Animals, a non-government organization for ethical animal treatment, suggested auctioning the goats to U.S. citizens on the mainland. This plan eliminated 3,000 goats from the island just by moving them to mainland farms to be domesticated once more, and many of the goats that had not been bought were adopted by the Fund for Animals agency instead to protect them. Any remaining goats were permitted to be shot by the United States Navy and as of 1991, the island has been declared free of its feral goat issue. The Livestock Conservancy considers them a critically endangered heritage breed. In 2008, their global population was approximately 400, all domesticated.

=== Wales ===
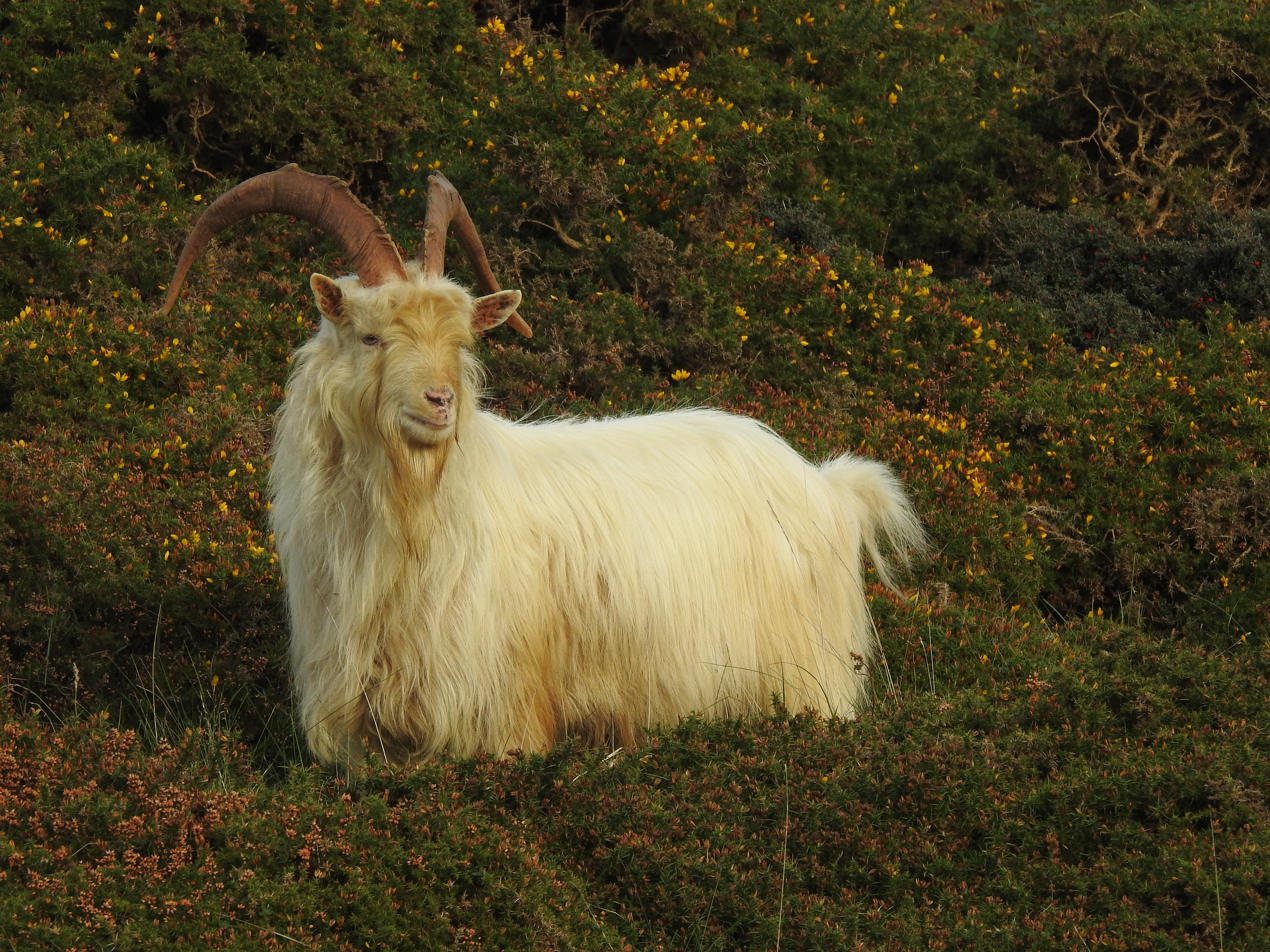
One of the Kashmiri Goats on the Great Orme near Llandudno

Feral goats occur in mountain ranges across Wales, such as those in the Rhinogydd range in Snowdonia (Eryri) and those at Stackpole in Pembrokeshire.

Arguably the most notable herd of feral goats in Wales is the 200 or so Kashmiri found on the Great Orme near Llandudno. The herd originated as a gift from Queen Victoria to the Baron Mostyn and have roamed the limestone headland for over 100 years. They are wild and have no official owner, with their population being managed by Conwy County Borough Council. Over time, the goats have become a tourist attraction and a part of local identity and became an Internet meme during the COVID-19 pandemic in Wales when the herd wandered into the deserted town centre during government lockdowns, navigating their way through the deserted streets and eating flowerbeds and garden hedges.

=== India ===
Feral goats in India are best known from Barren Island in the Andaman Islands. Domestic goats were released on Barren, Cinque and Narcondam islands, and the introduction is recorded as dating to around 1700. Barren Island is home to India's only active volcano, and the goats living there have survived in a harsh environment with little vegetation and frequent volcanic activity. The current size of the population is not known. They are reported to drink seawater and to move to safer parts of the island when the volcano erupts. Currently, conservation proposals for the island's feral and semi-feral goats include keeping live animals and their DNA at research institutes.

== Short- and long-term effects of feral goat invasions ==
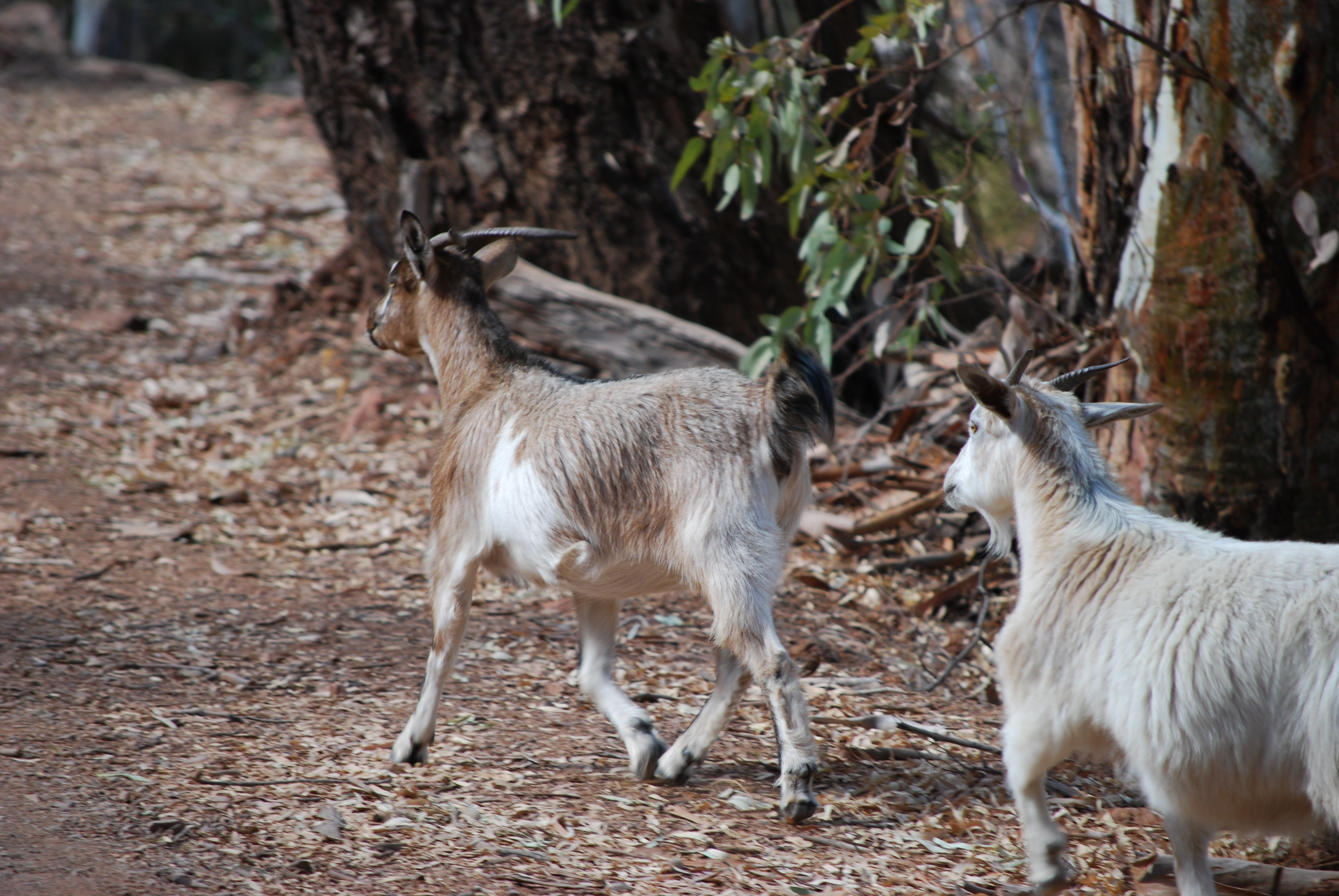
Feral goats at Wilpena Pound in South Australia. While feral goats were introduced into the Flinders Range in the 1840s, they only grew to become a problem after the eradication of dingos in the 1940s.

Feral goats in any country cause many long-term problems pertaining to the native vegetation. These problems are caused by overgrazing of these species, as well as the erosion of soil due to the loss of plant roots. These goats also affect native animal species because they are using a multitude of resources, causing an increased amount of competition. Lastly, they can affect the ecosystem by spreading plants and weeds into areas that they are not typically seen in through their excrement. This eventually causes damage because native species of plants now have competition. Besides environmental damage, they also cause damage to the economy by damaging agriculture and causing the government to spend money to either control or kill them.
