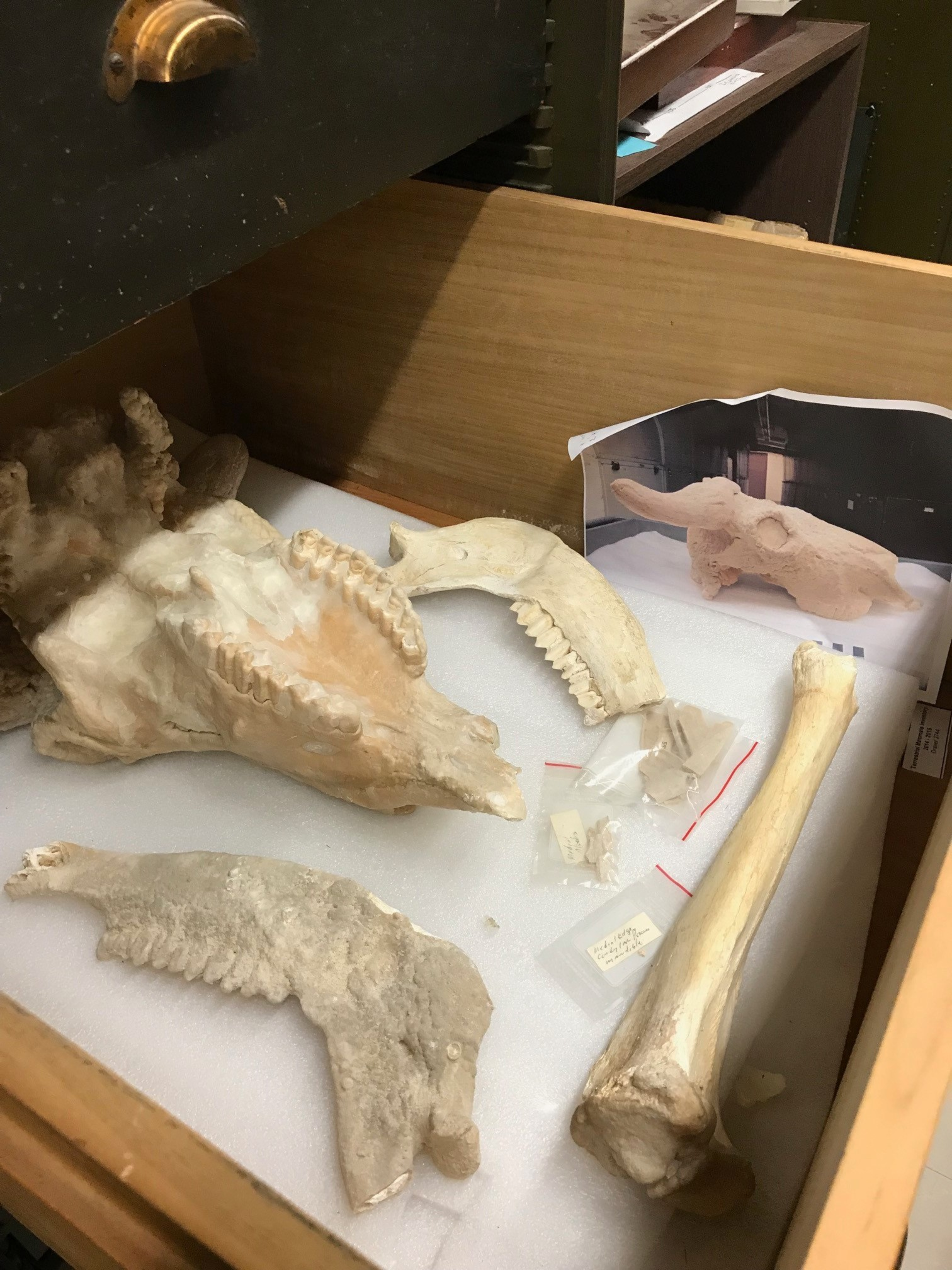
- Holotype specimen in a drawer

Scientific classification
- Kingdom: Animalia
- Phylum: Chordata
- Class: Mammalia
- Order: Artiodactyla
- Family: Bovidae
- Subfamily: Caprinae
- Tribe: Ovibovini
- Genus: †Speleotherium; White, Mead & Morgan, 2025
- Species: †S. logani

Binomial name
- †Speleotherium logani White, Mead & Morgan, 2025

= Speleotherium =

Speleotherium Temporal range: Late Pleistocene, Rancholabrean NALMA

Genus of fossil mammals

Speleotherium (lit. 'cave beast') is an extinct genus of bovid hoofed mammals known from the late Pleistocene (Rancholabrean faunal stage) of North America. The genus contains a single species, Speleotherium logani, also called Logan's austral scrubox, known from remains found in the United States, Mexico, and Belize. Speleotherium is classified in the tribe Ovibovini, which includes the extant muskox (Ovibos moschatus). It has short, backward-pointed horns and robust metacarpals and metatarsals, similar to the modern takin, indicating the two may have similar ecologies. Speleotherium is both the smallest and southernmost ovibovine known from North America.

== Discovery and naming ==
In 1954, a fossiliferous cave site was discovered in Carlsbad Caverns National Park in Eddy County, southeastern New Mexico, United States. It was named 'Muskox Cave', after the prevalence of muskox-like fossils preserved there. In 1976 and 1977, joint expeditions were carried out to Muskox Cave by Texas Tech University, the Smithsonian Institution, and the National Park Service, with excavations and exploration led by Lloyd E. Logan, resulting in the collection of abundant fossil vertebrate remains. Despite the large amount of collected specimens, few were scientifically studied or described. Among the 'muskox' material collected in the cave was a complete skull of an adult individual, which was mentioned and illustrated in the scientific literature multiple times, albeit classified as Euceratherium collinum (shrubox), another extinct ovibovine. This skull, in addition to the associated mandible, is housed in the National Museum of Natural History (Department of Paleobiology), part of the Smithsonian Institution, where it is permanently accessioned as specimen USNM PAL 598576. When discovered, these remains were submerged in a cave pool, resulting in a covering of flowstone, 3–12 millimetres (0.12–0.47 in) thick, over all of the skull. Although flowstone fills the foramina, nasal cavities, and the space beneath the palate, as well as obscures other bony landmarks and sutures, the anatomy and distinctive features are still readily visible.

In 2023, after beginning the preparation and cataloging of the Muskox Cave fossils, researchers including Richard S. White, Jim I. Mead, and Gary S. Morgan, observed that the putative "Euceratherium" material was not only notably distinct from this genus, but also all other bovids. In 2025, White, Mead, and Morgan described Speleotherium logani as a new genus and species of ovibovine based on these fossil remains, establishing USNM PAL 598576 as the holotype specimen. The generic name, Speleotherium, combines the Greek words speos, meaning 'cave', and therion, meaning 'beast'. The specific name, logani, honors Lloyd E. Logan, the discoverer of the holotype, who led excavation work in Muskox Cave. The researchers proposed the common name 'Logan's austral scrubox' for this species, with 'scrub' referring to the vegetation community of the ecosystem the species was a member of. Speleotherium is one of the very few large mammal genera from the late Pleistocene of North America to be named since the end of 19th century, during which fossils of most genera were found and named, given their temporal recency.

Several additional remains from Muskox Cave were also referred to S. logani, including an occipital bone, several isolated hemimandibles with associated teeth, a maxilla (upper jaw bone) with teeth, various isolated teeth, and several right and left metacarpals and metatarsals. Many postcranial remains are also known from Muskox Cave, found in association with the holotype skull, but have not been described. Two metacarpals and metatarsals were found in U-Bar Cave of Hidalgo County, New Mexico (housed in the Biodiversity Collections at the University of Texas). The recognition of the New Mexico materials as a distinct taxon allowed for the reidentification of muskox-like fossils found elsewhere as belonging to Speleotherium logani. These include three metacarpals and metatarsals, a proximal (upper) tibia, and a distal (lower) humerus from Sotano del Arroyo Cave in San Luis Potosí, Mexico (housed in the San Bernardino County Museum in California, US), a metacarpal and metatarsal from Zaragosa Cave in Nuevo León, Mexico (housed in the Natural History Museum of Los Angeles County in California, US), and two partial metacarpals and a metatarsal and a distal humerus from Cebada Cave, Belize (housed in the Mammoth Site Comparative Collection in South Dakota, US). As such, Speleotherium is known from fossils found further south than any other ovibovine.

== Description ==
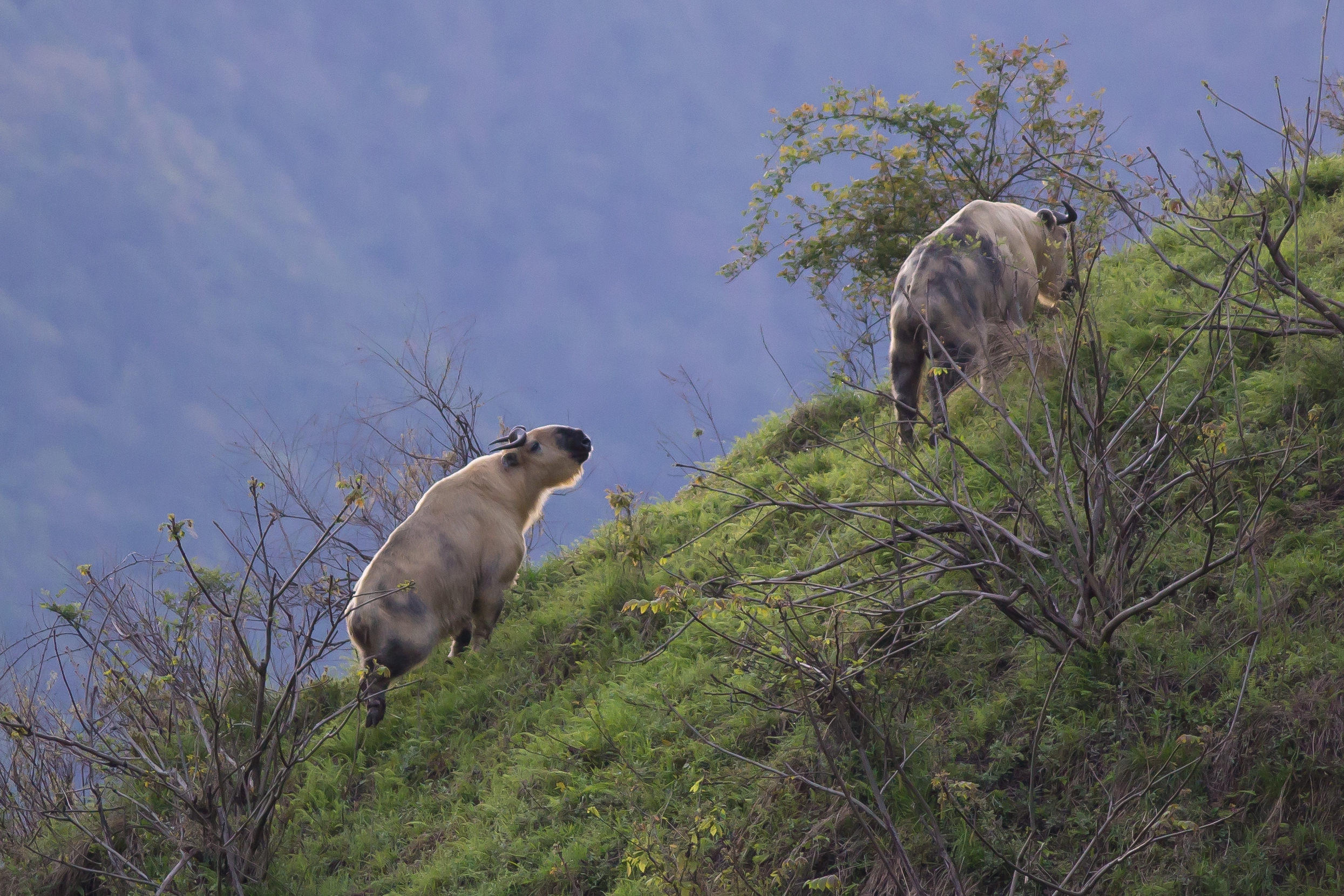
Speleotherium may have occupied a niche similar to the modern takin (Budorcas taxicolor; pictured in a nature reserve) based on comparable metapodial anatomy

The size of the preserved metapodials (metacarpals and metatarsals) and the length of the upper tooth rows indicate Speleotherium is the smallest known ovibovine from North America. It has been estimated to measure around 4 feet (1.2 m) tall at the shoulder, weighing between 400–700 lb (180–320 kg).

=== Skull ===
The skull has horn cores (the bony part of the horn without the keratin covering) that project laterally (outward) from the frontal bone, being directed about 18° posteriorly (backward) before curving slightly dorsally (upwards) at the tip. The bases of the horns are expanded upward and toward the skull midline, forming a boss. The horn cores are roughly circular when observed in cross-section. It has a distinctly large lacrimal fossa positioned in front of and below the orbit.

=== Metapodials ===
The metapodial bones are comparatively shorter and wider than those of Euceratherium and the extant muskox (Ovibos). The proportions and robustness of the Speleotherium metapodials are distinctly similar to those of the modern takin (Budorcas taxicolor). While this may not indicate a close phylogenetic relationship between the two genera—molecular and morphological analyses find conflicting placements for Budorcas in relation to ovibovines—it may indicate the two occupied a convergently similar ecological niche. The metapodial morphology of Speleotherium is consistent with modern animals that live in hilly or mountainous terrain, contrasting with the discovery of its fossils in lower-elevation environments. Researchers have speculated it may have had habits similar to the modern mountain goat (Oreamnos americanus).

=== Pathology ===
One of the Speleotherium metatarsals from Arroyo del Sotano Cave bears a robust bridging fibrocartilage callus, indicating the bone had been fractured. As the callus had not been resorbed, the animal died before complete healing of the injury. This would have affected efficiency of locomotion, although it likely regained most of its original function after four to six months, as evidenced by the robust callus. Researchers speculated that the individual sustained the injury from the glancing kick of a member of the same species in an agonistic encounter.

== Paleoenvironment ==
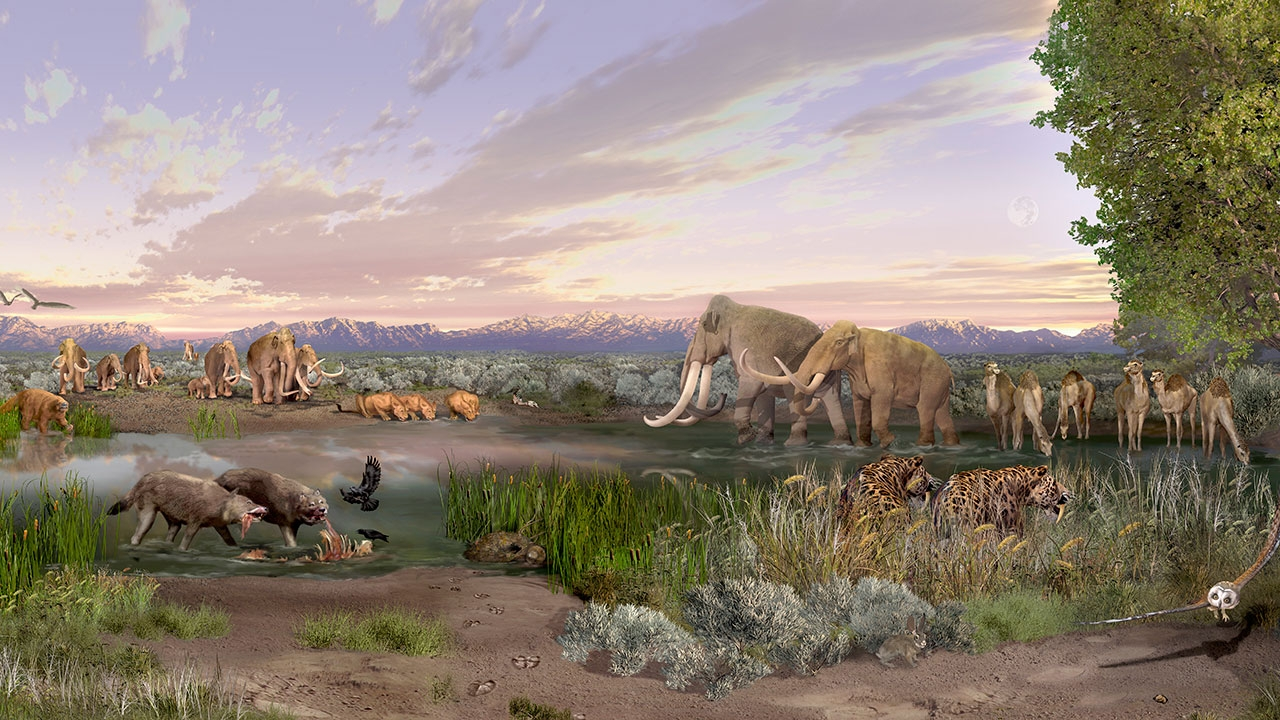
Paleoenvironmental reconstruction of New Mexico (White Sands National Park) during the late Pleistocene

Speleotherium fossils are most common in New Mexico, United States, but are also known from Mexico and Belize. All known remains are found in caves, dated to the Rancholabrean North American Land Mammal Age (NALMA), ranging from about 14,000 to 210,000 years ago. These deposits often yield the fossil remains of a fauna similar to that of the present day, including some of the same genera or species of large mammals. The vegetation in these localities during the late Pleistocene was likely comparable to what it is now.

=== Muskox and U-Bar caves (United States) ===
More than 50 mammal species have been reported from Muskox Cave, representing animals that would have been contemporary with Speleotherium. Speleotherium is the best-represented genus in the locality, with remains of Equus spp. (horses and their relatives) and Aenocyon dirus (dire wolf) also common. Other large ungulates (hooved mammals) include Stockoceros conklingi (a pronghorn relative), Ovis sp. (sheep), Oreamnos harringtoni (Harrington's mountain goat), and a camelid. Predators in the environment in addition to the dire wolf comprise two felids: Panthera atrox (American lion) and Miracinonyx trumani (American cheetah). Small mammals, birds, lizards, and snakes are also relatively common. This environment has been interpreted as a subalpine forest.

U-Bar Cave is in the Chihuahuan Desert, and is currently part of a scrub environment with Upper Sonoran woodland vegetation. Megafaunal mammals from this locality include Equus spp., a camelid (Camelops sp.), Oreamnos harringtoni, and Stockoceros conklingi, like Muskox Cave, in addition to Odocoileus lucasi (American mountain deer), Navahoceros sp., Antilocapra americana (pronghorn), Capromeryx (dwarf pronghorn), and Bison sp. Several amphibians, turtles, lizards, snakes, birds, and small mammals are also known.

=== Sotano del Arroyo and Zaragosa caves (Mexico) ===
Sotano del Arroyo Cave is currently in a coniferous forest, and represents the lowest-elevation locality from which Speleotherium is known, at 260 metres (850 ft). Navahoceros metacarpals have also been found here. Zaragosa Cave is higher in elevation, at 550 m (1,800 ft), and is in an environment dominated by xerophilous scrub and coniferous forest vegetation.

=== Cebada Cave (Belize) ===
An artiodactyl mandible found in Cebada Cave may belong to Speleotherium, but has not been relocated for study. Fossils of bats, Equus, and the extinct bear Tremarctos floridanus are also known from this cave. Pollen sampled from the matrix in the Speleotherium humerus shaft indicates it would have lived in a tropical forest with open tropical vegetation, including herbaceous and shrubby vegetation including members of the sunflower family, similar to the modern vegetation observed around the cave. The describers of Speleotherium suggested that the Central American vegetation zones likely shifted less dramatically than in the more northerly localities from which the genus is known. As such, the vegetation seen near Cebada Cave (a tropical dry forest) may have persisted since the late Pleistocene and be accurate across the distribution of Speleotherium.

== See also ==
- Bootherium
- Late Pleistocene extinctions
