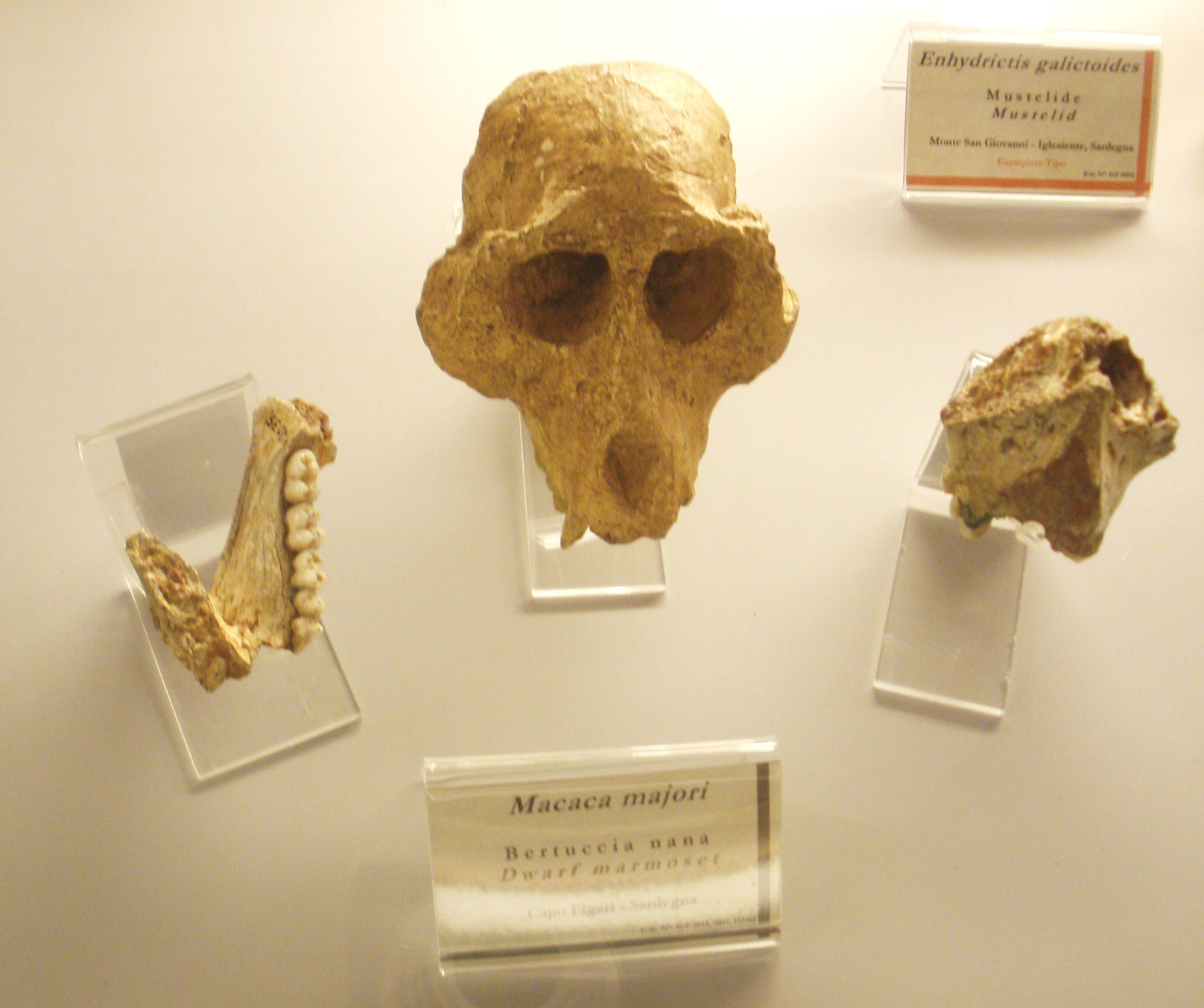
- Fossils

Scientific classification
- Kingdom: Animalia
- Phylum: Chordata
- Class: Mammalia
- Order: Primates
- Family: Cercopithecidae
- Genus: Macaca
- Species: †M. majori

Binomial name
- †Macaca majori Schaub and Azzaroli, 1946

Synonyms
- Macaca sylvunus majori Azzaroli, 1946

= Macaca majori =

Macaca majori Temporal range: Early Pleistocene

Extinct species of monkey

Macaca majori, commonly known as the dwarf macaque, is a prehistoric macaque from the Early Pleistocene of Sardinia, Italy. It descended from the Barbary macaque. Its temporal range spans from about 2 million to 0.8 million years ago, during the Nesogoral faunal complex, alongside the goat-antelope Nesogoral, the pig Sus sondaari, the hyena Chasmaporthetes, the pika Prolagus, the shrew Asoriculus, the mole Talpa tyrrhenica, the mustelid Pannonictis, and the dormouse Tyrrhenoglis.

== Palaeobiology ==
=== Palaeoecology ===
The tooth microwear in Macaca majori indicates that M. majori likely fed on harder foods and occupied a different dietary niche compared to its mainland fossil relatives. Additionally, the maxillary molars of M. majori are characterised by shorter, blunter cusps relative to its mainland relatives, along with significantly greater enamel thickness. This likewise indicates that M. majori was a durophage that regularly consumed seeds, nuts, and fruits.
