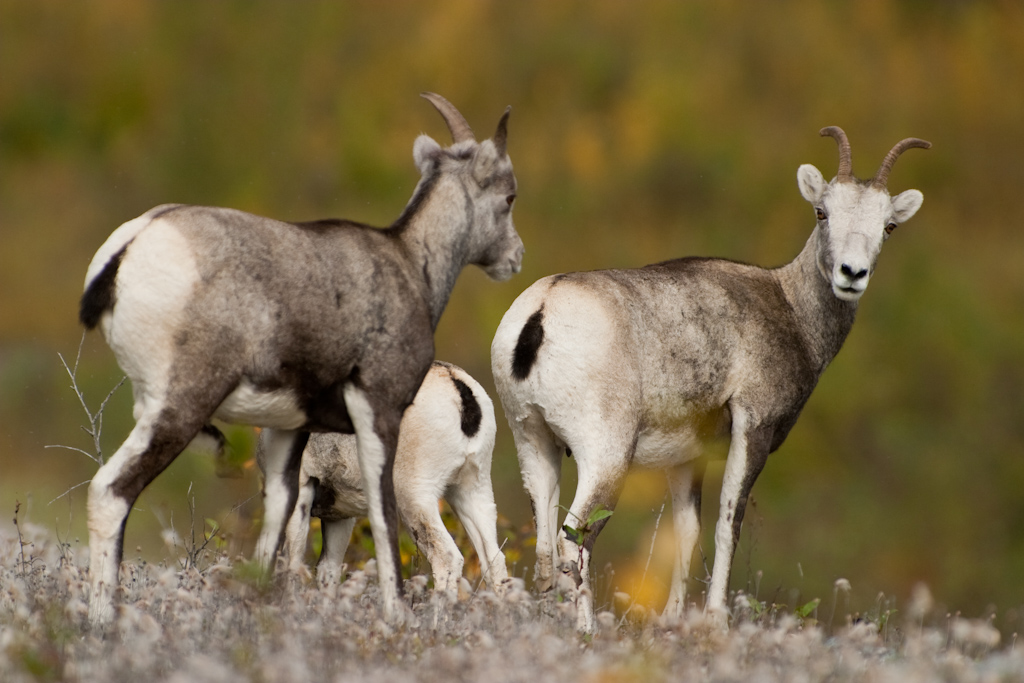
- Stone sheep (Ovis dalli stonei) in British Columbia, 2009

Scientific classification
- Kingdom: Animalia
- Phylum: Chordata
- Class: Mammalia
- Order: Artiodactyla
- Family: Bovidae
- Subfamily: Caprinae; J. E. Gray, 1821

Tribes
- Caprini; Ovibovini; Pantholopini

= Caprinae =

Caprinae Temporal range: Late Miocene – present

Subfamily of mammals

The subfamily Caprinae, also sometimes referred to as the tribe Caprini, is part of the ruminant family Bovidae, and consists of mostly medium-sized bovids. A member of this subfamily is called a caprine.

Prominent members include sheep and goats, with some other members referred to as goat antelopes. Some earlier taxonomies considered Caprinae a separate family called Capridae (with the members being caprids), but now it is usually considered either a subfamily within the Bovidae, or a tribe within the subfamily Antilopinae of the family Bovidae, with caprines being a type of bovid.

== Characteristics ==
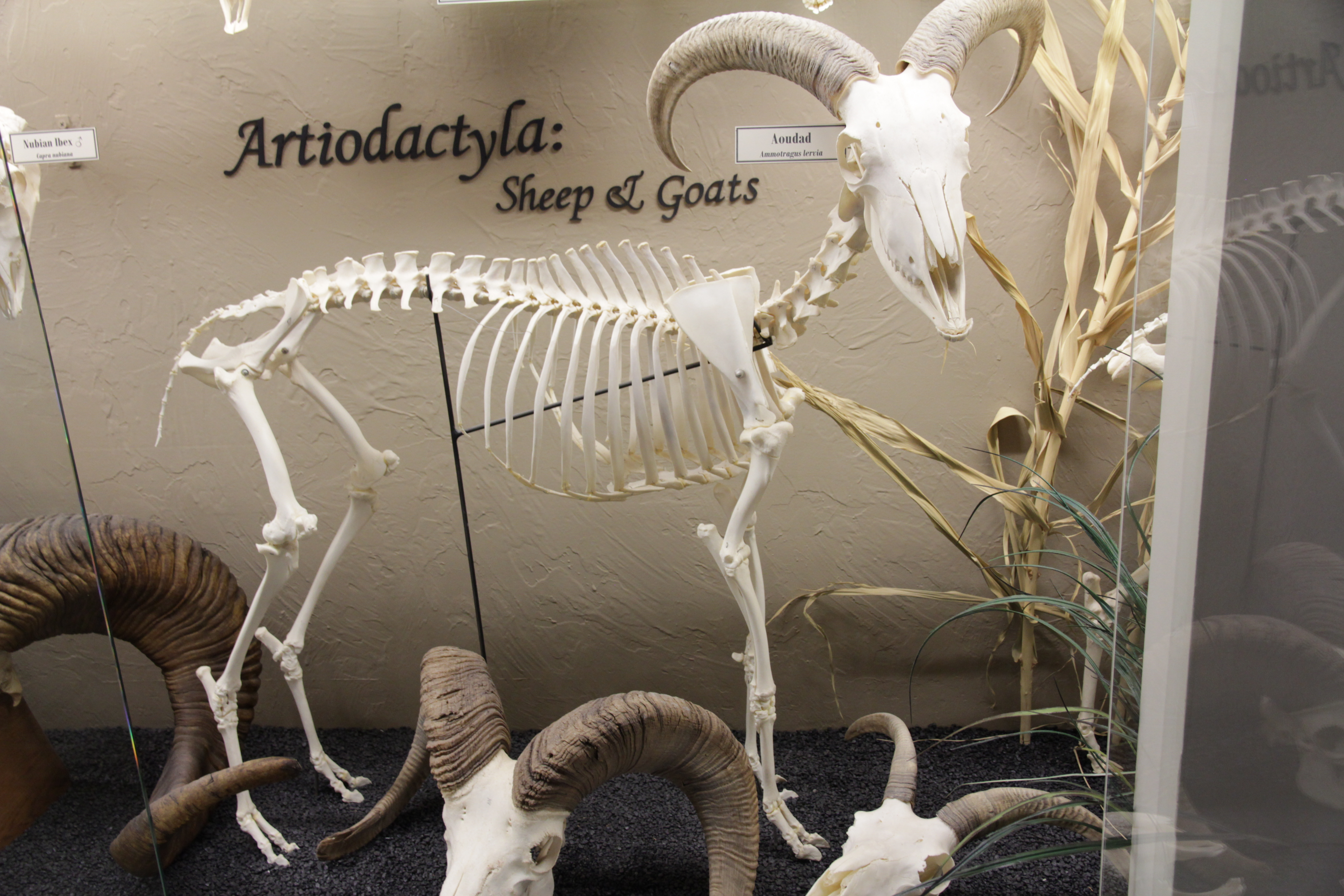
Skeleton of a Barbary sheep (Ammotragus lervia) on display at the Museum of Osteology

Although most goat-antelopes are gregarious and have fairly stocky builds, they diverge in many other ways – the muskox (Ovibos moschatus) is adapted to the extreme cold of the tundra; the mountain goat (Oreamnos americanus) of North America is specialised for very rugged terrain; the urial (Ovis orientalis) occupies a largely infertile area from Kashmir to Iran, including much desert country. The Armenian mouflon (Ovis gmelini gmelini) is thought to be the ancestor of the modern domestic sheep (Ovis aries).

Many species have become extinct since the last ice age, probably largely because of human interaction. Of the survivors:

- Five are classified as endangered
- Eight as vulnerable
- Seven as of concern and needing conservation measures, but at lower risk
- Seven species are secure

Members of the group vary considerably in size, from just over 1 m (3 ft) long for a full-grown grey goral (Naemorhedus goral), to almost 2.5 m (8 ft 2 in) long for a musk ox, and from under 30 kg (66 lb) to more than 350 kg (770 lb). Musk oxen in captivity have reached over 650 kg (1,430 lb).

The lifestyles of caprids fall into two broad classes: 'resource-defenders', which are territorial and defend a small, food-rich area against other members of the same species; and 'grazers', which gather together into herds and roam freely over a larger, usually relatively infertile area.

The resource-defenders are the more primitive group: they tend to be smaller, dark in colour, males and females fairly alike, have long, tessellated ears, long manes, and dagger-shaped horns. The grazers (sometimes collectively known as tsoan caprids, from the Hebrew tso'n meaning sheep and goats) evolved more recently. They tend to be larger, highly social, and rather than mark territory with scent glands, they have highly evolved dominance behaviours. No sharp line divides the groups, but a continuum varies from the serows at one end of the spectrum to sheep, true goats, and musk oxen at the other.

== Evolution ==
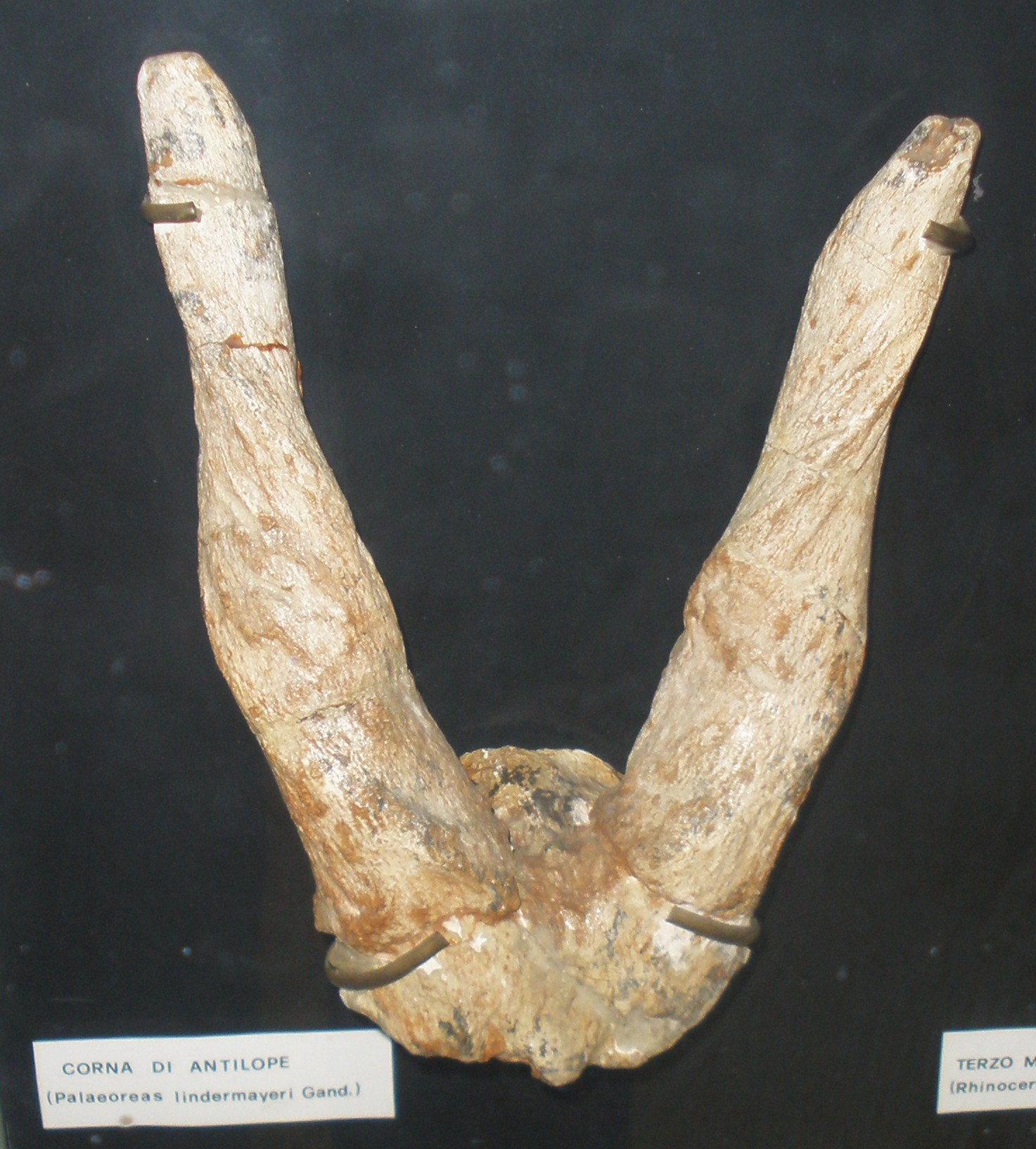
Palaeoreas lindermayeri fossil

The goat-antelope, or caprid, group is known from as early as the Miocene, when members of the group resembled the modern serow in their general body form. The group did not reach its greatest diversity until the recent ice ages, when many of its members became specialised for marginal, often extreme, environments: mountains, deserts, and the subarctic region.

The ancestors of the modern sheep and goats (both rather vague and ill-defined terms) are thought to have moved into mountainous regions – sheep becoming specialised occupants of the foothills and nearby plains, and relying on flight and flocking for defence against predators, and goats adapting to very steep terrain where predators are at a disadvantage.

Internal relationships of Caprinae based on mitochondrial DNA.

- Bovidae
  - - Bos
  - Caprinae
    - - Pantholops (Tibetan antelope)
    - - - - †Bootherium (helmeted muskox)
          - Ovibos (musk ox)
        - - Capricornis (serow)
          - Naemorhedus (goral)
      - - - Ovis (sheep)
        - - - - - Oreamnos (mountain goat)
              - - - Budorcas (takin)
                - - - †Myotragus (Balearic Islands goat)
            - - - Rupicapra (chamois)
          - - - - Ammotragus (Barbary sheep)
                - Arabitragus (Arabian tahr)
            - - - Pseudois (bharal)
              - - Hemitragus (Himalayan tahr)
                - Capra (turs, markhor, ibexes, & goats)

== Species ==
Phylogeny based on Hassanin et al., 2009 and Calamari, 2021.

Tribe or subtribe	Image	Genus	Species
Caprini or Caprina		Ammotragus (Blyth, 1840)	Barbary sheep, Ammotragus lervia
Caprini or Caprina		Arabitragus; Ropiquet & Hassanin, 2005	Arabian tahr, Arabitragus jayakari
Caprini or Caprina		Budorcas; Hodgson, 1850	takin, Budorcas taxicolor; Sichuan takin, Budorcas tibetana
Caprini or Caprina		Capra; Linnaeus, 1758	West Asian ibex, Capra aegagrus; bezoar ibex, Capra aegagrus aegagrus; Sindh ibex, Capra aegagrus blythi; west Caucasian tur, Capra caucasica; east Caucasian tur, Capra cylindricornis; markhor, Capra falconeri; domestic goat, Capra hircus; alpine ibex, Capra ibex; Nubian ibex, Capra nubiana; Iberian ibex, Capra pyrenaica; western Spanish ibex, Capra pyrenaica victoriae; southeastern Spanish ibex, Capra pyrenaica hispanica; †Portuguese ibex, Capra pyreneaica lusitanica; †Pyrenean ibex, Capra pyreneaica pyrenaica; Siberian ibex, Capra sibirica; Walia ibex, Capra walie
Caprini or Caprina		Hemitragus (Hodgson, 1841)	Himalayan tahr, Hemitragus jemlahicus
Caprini or Caprina		Nilgiritragus; Ropiquet & Hassanin, 2005	Nilgiri tahr, Nilgiritragus hylocrius
Caprini or Caprina		Oreamnos; Rafinesque, 1817	mountain goat, Oreamnos americanus
Caprini or Caprina		Ovis; Linnaeus, 1758	argali, Ovis ammon; Marco Polo sheep, Ovis ammon polii; domestic sheep, Ovis aries; bighorn sheep, Ovis canadensis; Dall sheep, Ovis dalli; mouflon, Ovis gmelini; snow sheep, Ovis nivicola; urial, Ovis vignei
Caprini or Caprina		Pseudois; Hodgson, 1846	bharal (Himalayan blue sheep), Pseudois nayaur
Caprini or Caprina		Rupicapra; Garsault, 1764	Pyrenean chamois, Rupicapra pyrenaica; alpine chamois, Rupicapra rupicapra
Ovibovini or Ovibovina		Capricornis; Ogilby, 1837	Japanese serow, Capricornis crispus; mainland serow, Capricornis sumatraensis (Note: Calamari (2021) elevates the subspecies of mainland serow to full species status. Given IUCN classification and current Wikipedia status, they are listed as subspecies here.); Sumatran serow, C. s. sumatraensis; Chinese serow, C. s. milneedwardsii; Himalayan serow, C. s. thar; red serow, Capricornis rubidus; Taiwan serow, Capricornis swinhoei
Ovibovini or Ovibovina		Naemorhedus; Hamilton Smith, 1827	red goral, Naemorhedus baileyi; long-tailed goral, Naemorhedus caudatus; gray goral, Naemorhedus goral; Chinese goral, Naemorhedus griseus
Ovibovini or Ovibovina		Ovibos; Blainville, 1816	muskox, Ovibos moschatus
Pantholopini or Pantholopina		Pantholops; Hodgson, 1834	Tibetan antelope, Pantholops hodgsonii

== Fossil genera ==
The following extinct genera of Caprinae have been identified:

- Tribe Caprini
  - Genus Myotragus †
    - Myotragus balearicus†
- Tribe Ovibovini
  - Genus Bootherium †
    - Bootherium bombifrons†
  - Genus Euceratherium †
    - Euceratherium collinum†
  - Genus Makapania †
    - Makapania broomi†
  - Genus Megalovis †
  - Genus Soergelia †
    - Soergelia mayfieldi†
  - Genus Speleotherium †
    - Speleotherium logani†
  - Genus Tsaidamotherium †
    - Tsaidamotherium brevirostrum†
    - Tsaidamotherium hedini†

Unsorted

- †Benicerus
- †Boopsis
- †Capraoryx
- †Caprotragoides
- †Criotherium
- †Damalavus
- †Ebusia
- †Gallogoral
- †Lyrocerus
- †Mesembriacerus
- †Neotragocerus
- †Nesogoral
- †Norbertia
- †Numidocapra
- †Oioceros
- †Olonbulukia
- †Pachygazella
- †Pachytragus
- †Palaeoreas
- †Palaeoryx
- †Paraprotoryx
- †Parapseudotragus
- †Parurmiatherium
- †Praeovibos
- †Procamptoceras
- †Prosinotragus
- †Protoryx
- †Protovis
- †Pseudotragus
- †Qurliqnoria
- †Samotragus
- †Sinocapra
- †Sinomegoceros
- †Sinopalaeoceros
- †Sinotragus
- †Sivacapra
- †Sporadotragus
- †Tethytragus
- †Tossunnoria
- †Turcocerus
- †Urmiatherium
