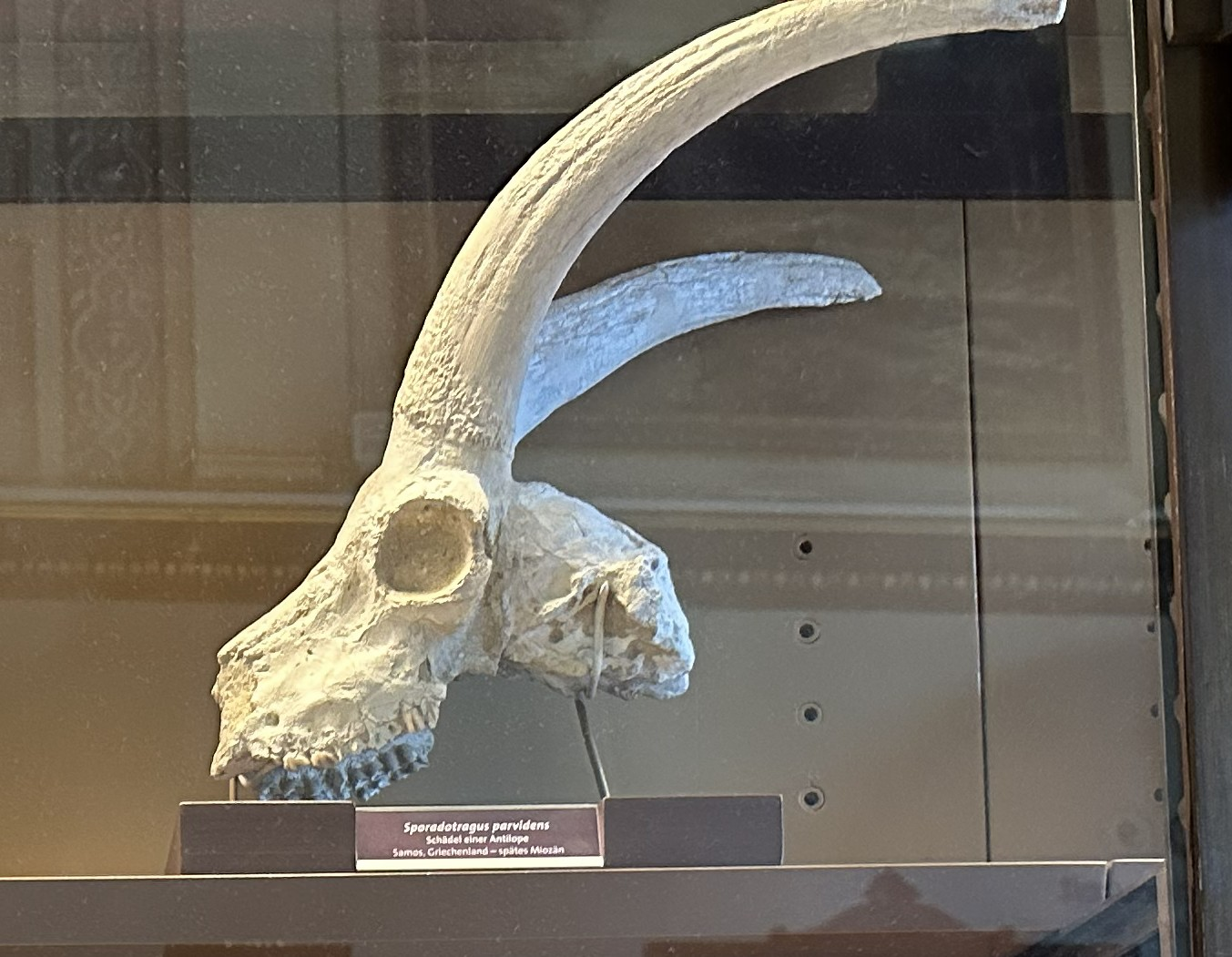

Scientific classification
- Kingdom: Animalia
- Phylum: Chordata
- Class: Mammalia
- Order: Artiodactyla
- Family: Bovidae
- Genus: †Sporadotragus; Kretzoi, 1968

= Sporadotragus =

Sporadotragus Temporal range: Miocene

Extinct genus of mammals

Sporadotragus is an extinct genus of caprine bovid that inhabited Eurasia during the Miocene epoch.

== Distribution ==
S. tadzhikistanicus is known from Afghanistan. The species S. vasili is known from the fossil sites of Strumyani and Kalimantsi in Bulgaria. S. parvidens is known from Greece, as well as from southwestern Turkey, where its fossils are found in the Yatağan Basin, along with the Beyağaç Basin.

== Palaeoecology ==
Dental microwear suggests that S. tadzhikistanicus had a "meal by meal" mixed feeding diet.
