= Olonbulukia =

Olonbulukia Temporal range: Late Miocene

Scientific classification
- Kingdom: Animalia
- Phylum: Chordata
- Class: Mammalia
- Infraclass: Placentalia
- Order: Artiodactyla
- Family: Bovidae
- Subfamily: Caprinae
- Genus: †Olonbulukia; Bohlin, 1937
- Species: †O. tsaidamensis

Binomial name
- †Olonbulukia tsaidamensis Bohlin, 1937

Extinct genus of caprine

Olonbulukia is an extinct genus of caprine from the Late Miocene. It is monotypic, containing the only species Olonbulukia tsaidamensis.

== Distribution ==
Fossils of the species Olonbulukia tsaidamensis have been found in northern China.
