= Paraprotoryx =

Paraprotoryx Temporal range: Miocene

Scientific classification
- Domain: Eukaryota
- Kingdom: Animalia
- Phylum: Chordata
- Class: Mammalia
- Order: Artiodactyla
- Family: Bovidae
- Subfamily: Caprinae
- Tribe: Caprini
- Genus: †Paraprotoryx; Bohlin, 1935
- Species: †P. minor

Binomial name
- †Paraprotoryx minor Bohlin, 1935

Extinct genus of mammals

Paraprotoryx was a genus of caprine bovid that lived during the Miocene epoch.

== Geographic range ==
Fossilised remains of the species Paraprotoryx minor have been found in China, where it was a member of the Baode Fauna.
