= Qurliqnoria =

Qurliqnoria Temporal range: Miocene–Pliocene

Scientific classification
- Kingdom: Animalia
- Phylum: Chordata
- Class: Mammalia
- Order: Artiodactyla
- Family: Bovidae
- Genus: †Qurliqnoria; Bohlin, 1937

Extinct genus of mammals

Qurliqnoria is an extinct genus of caprine bovid that inhabited Eurasia during the Neogene period.

== Distribution ==
The species Q. bohlini and Q. chorakensis inhabited Turkey and are believed to represent a chronospecies succession. Q. cheni and Q. hundesiensis are known from China and likewise appear to represent a chronospecies succession, with fossils of the former dating to the Tortonian, while the latter's remains are from the Pliocene.
