= Lyrocerus =

Lyrocerus Temporal range: Neogene

Scientific classification
- Domain: Eukaryota
- Kingdom: Animalia
- Phylum: Chordata
- Class: Mammalia
- Order: Artiodactyla
- Family: Bovidae
- Subfamily: Caprinae
- Genus: †Lyrocerus; Teilhard de Jardin and Trassaert, 1938

Species
- Lyrocerus sata

Extinct genus of mammals

Lyrocerus is an extinct genus of caprine bovid that inhabited Eurasia during the Neogene period.

== Distribution ==
Lyrocerus sata is known from China, where it was a member of the Mazegou Fauna.
