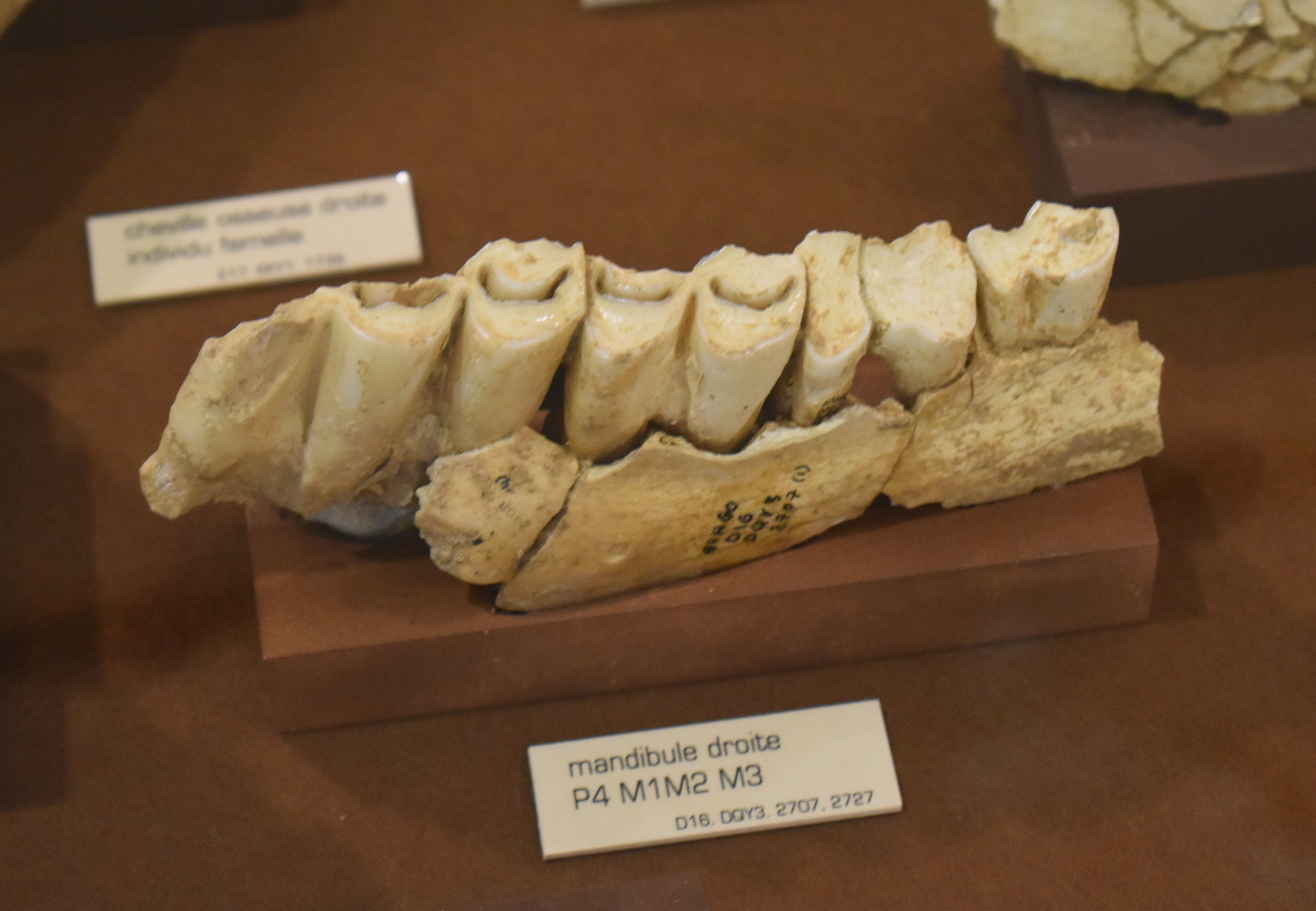
- Fossil of Praeovibos priscus at Musée de Préhistoire de Tautavel

Scientific classification
- Kingdom: Animalia
- Phylum: Chordata
- Class: Mammalia
- Order: Artiodactyla
- Family: Bovidae
- Genus: †Praeovibos; Staudinger, 1908
- Species: †P. priscus

Binomial name
- †Praeovibos priscus Staudinger, 1908

= Praeovibos =

Praeovibos Temporal range: Pleistocene

Species of mammal

Praeovibos, also known as the giant muskox, is an extinct genus of bovid that contains a single species, Praeovibos priscus. It is closely related to the living muskox (Ovibos moschatus), and is placed as a part of the same tribe Ovibovini.

== Description ==
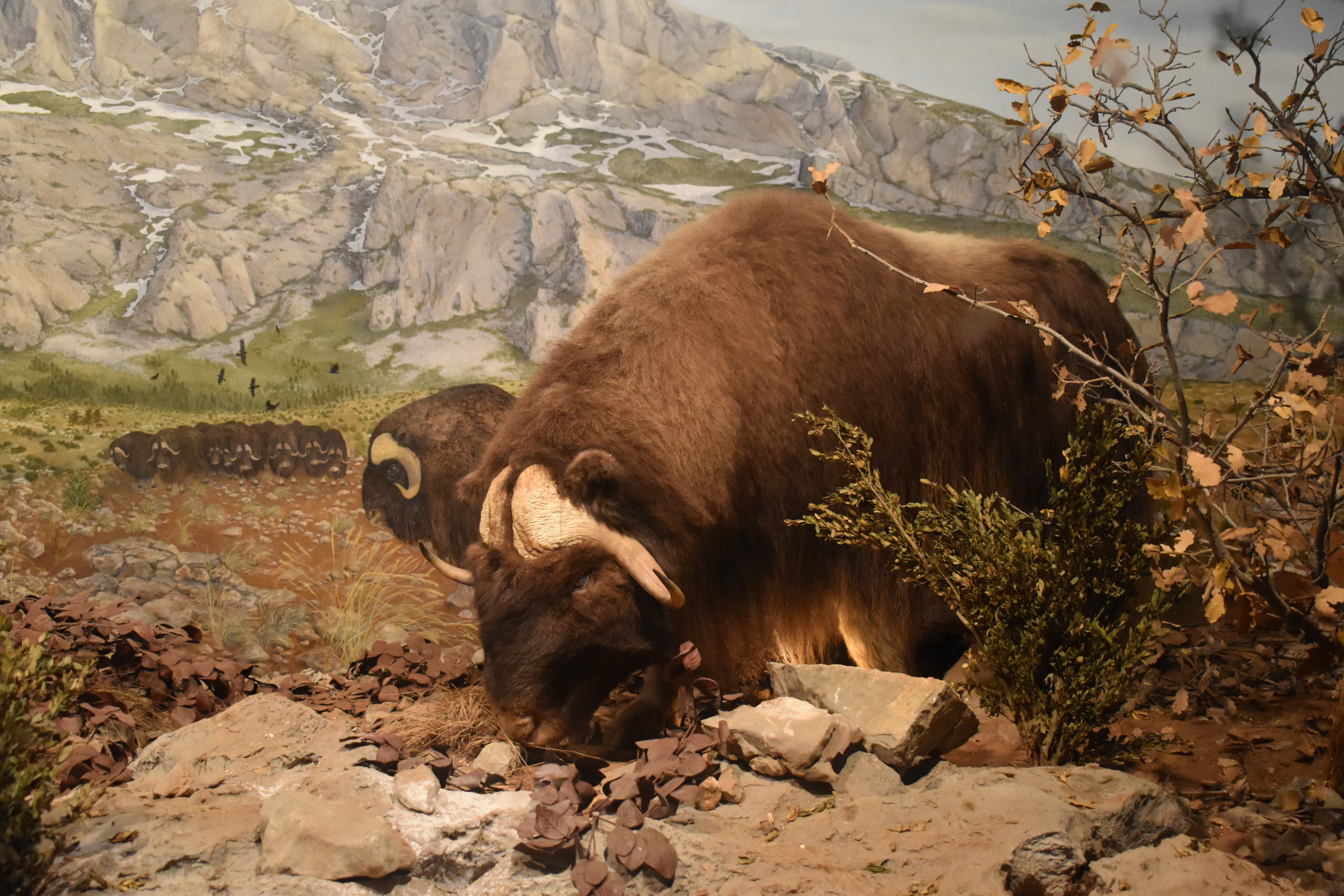
Restoration of Praeovibos priscus at Musée de Préhistoire de Tautavel

Praeovibos priscus was larger than the modern muskox (Ovibos moschatus) with a shoulder height of 130–165 cm and longer, more massive limbs.

== Evolution, distribution and habitat ==
The earliest fossils of the genus date to the Early Pleistocene, around 1.5 million years ago.

The giant muskox was widespread during the Pleistocene, ranging from western Europe to Alaska and the Northern Yukon Territory. During the Glacial Periods Praeovibos priscus lived in the upland together with reindeer (Rangifer tarandus) and other alpine animals. This species also lived in open wooded or savanna-like habitat, however in Spain and England it has been found living in moist, temperate forests. The youngest fossils date to the Last Glacial Period, less than 50,000 years ago.

== Ecology ==
Analysis of specimens from the Early Pleistocene of Spain suggests that Praeovibos was primarily a grazer.
