= Urmiatherium =

Urmiatherium Temporal range: Miocene

Scientific classification
- Kingdom: Animalia
- Phylum: Chordata
- Class: Mammalia
- Order: Artiodactyla
- Family: Bovidae
- Subfamily: Caprinae
- Tribe: Caprini
- Genus: †Urmiatherium; Rodler, 1889

Species
- Urmiatherium cheni (Shi & Qiu, 2026); Urmiatherium intermedium (Schlosser, 1903); Urmiatherium kassandriensis (Lazaridis, Kostopoulos, Lyras & Roussiakis, 2017); Urmiatherium polaki Rodler, 1889; Urmiatherium rugosifrons (Sickenberg, 1932)

Synonyms
- Parurmiatherium Sickenberg, 1932

Extinct genus of mammals

Urmiatherium is an extinct genus of caprine bovid that inhabited Eurasia during the Neogene period.

== Distribution ==
U. rugosifrons is known from fossil remains found in Greece and Turkey.

== Palaeoecology ==
U. rugosifrons is believed to have been a grazer, and is the only grazing herbivore found in the Late Miocene ruminant fossil assemblage of Samos.
