= Tossunnoria =

Tossunnoria Temporal range: Miocene

Scientific classification
- Domain: Eukaryota
- Kingdom: Animalia
- Phylum: Chordata
- Class: Mammalia
- Order: Artiodactyla
- Family: Bovidae
- Genus: †Tossunnoria; Bohlin, 1937
- Species: †T. pseudibex

Binomial name
- †Tossunnoria pseudibex Bohlin, 1937

Extinct genus of mammals

Tossunnoria is an extinct genus of caprine bovid from the Miocene epoch.

== Distribution ==
Fossils of Tossunnoria pseudibex, the only species known in this genus, are known from the Late Miocene of Tibet.
