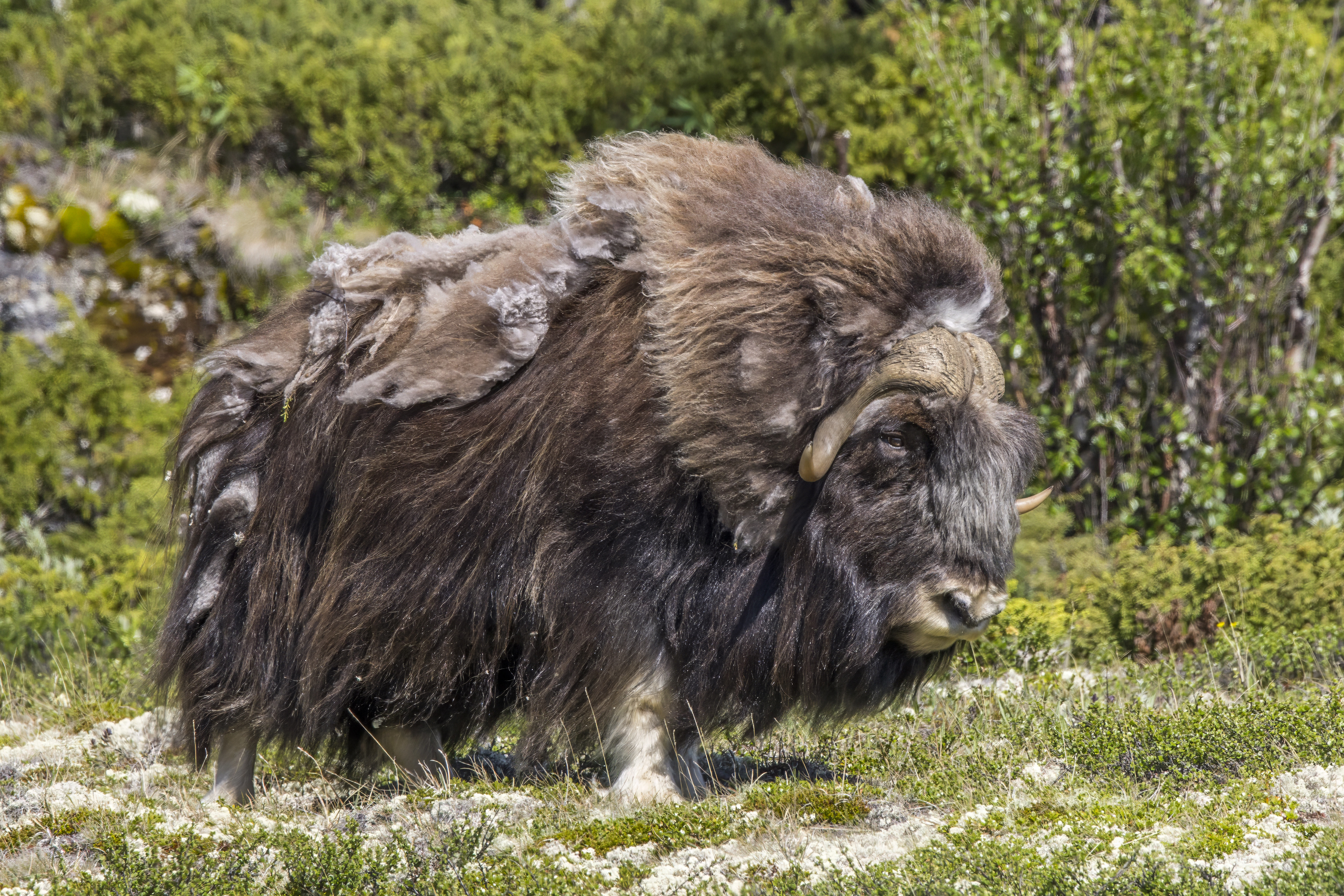
- In Dovrefjell National park, Norway

Conservation status
- Least Concern (IUCN 3.1)

- Secure (NatureServe)

Scientific classification
- Kingdom: Animalia
- Phylum: Chordata
- Class: Mammalia
- Order: Artiodactyla
- Family: Bovidae
- Subfamily: Caprinae
- Tribe: Ovibovini
- Genus: Ovibos; Blainville, 1816
- Species: O. moschatus

Binomial name
- Ovibos moschatus (Zimmermann, 1780)
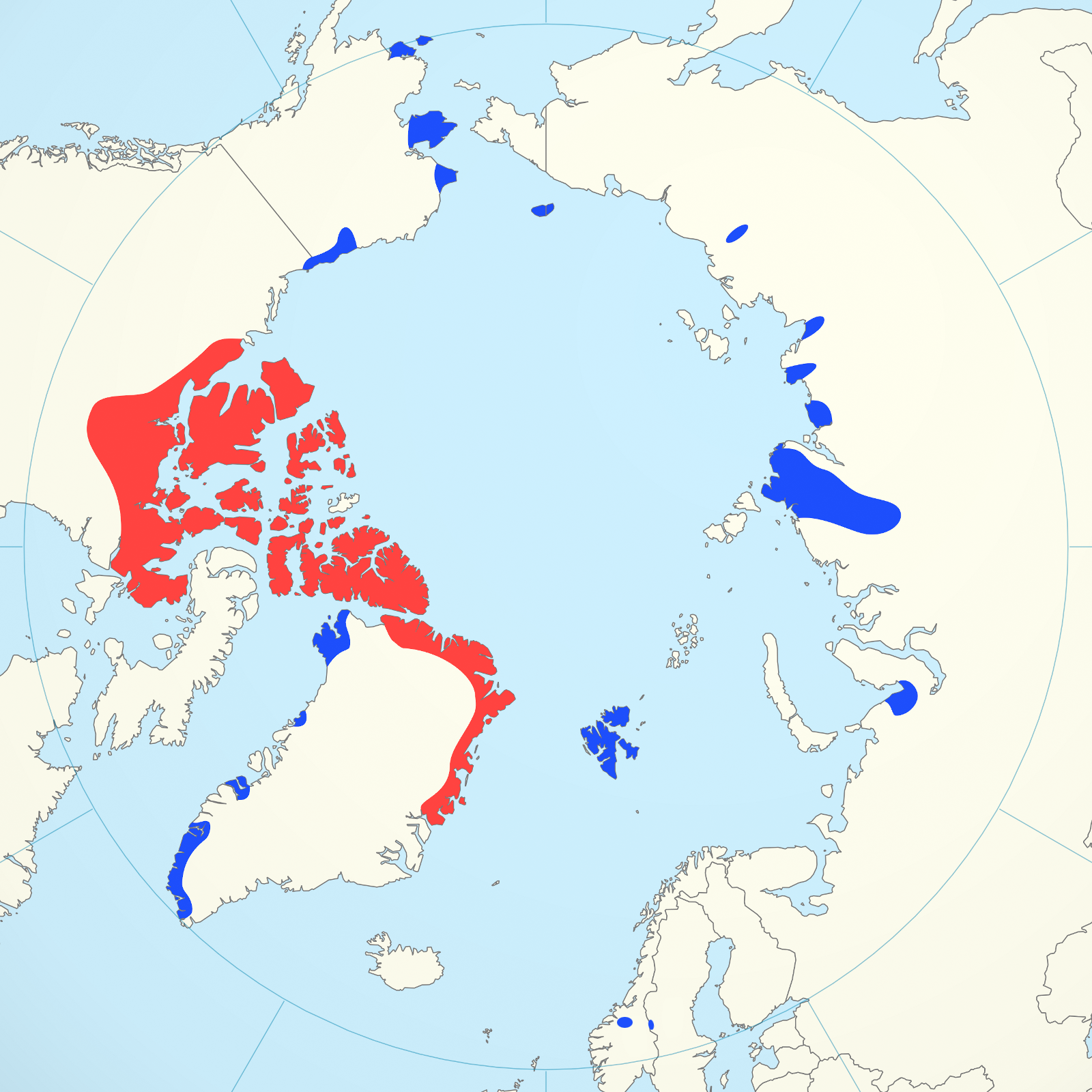
- Range map: blue indicates areas where muskox reintroduction has been attempted in the 20th century; red indicates the previously established range.

Synonyms
- Generic: Bosovis Kowarzik, 1911; Specific: Bos moschatus Zimmermann, 1780; Bosovis moschatus (Zimmermann, 1780) Kowarzik, 1911; Ovibos pallantis Hamilton-Smith, 1827

= Muskox =

Muskox Temporal range: 0.2–0 Ma Middle Pleistocene – Holocene

Species of arctic land mammal

The muskox (Ovibos moschatus) (Note: in Latin "musky sheep-ox") (Note: also spelled musk ox and musk-ox, plural muskoxen or musk oxen (in Inuktitut: ᐅᒥᖕᒪᒃ, romanized: umingmak; in Woods Cree: ᒫᖨᒨᐢ, romanized: mâthi-môs, ᒫᖨᒧᐢᑐᐢ, mâthi-mostos)) is a hoofed mammal of the family Bovidae. Native to the Arctic, it is noted for its thick coat and for the strong odour emitted by males during the seasonal rut, from which its name derives. This musky odour has the effect of attracting females during mating season. Its Inuktitut name umingmak translates to "the bearded one".

Its Woods Cree names mâthi-môs and mâthi-mostos translate to "ugly moose" and "ugly bison", respectively. Muskoxen are found primarily in Greenland, the Canadian Arctic of the Northwest Territories and Nunavut, as well as Alaska. They were formerly present in Eurasia, with their youngest natural records in the region dating to around 2,700 years ago. There are reintroduced populations in the U.S. state of Alaska, the Canadian territory of Yukon, and Siberia, and an introduced population in Norway, part of which emigrated to Sweden, where a small population now lives.

== Evolution ==
=== Extant relatives ===
The muskox is in the subtribe Ovibovina (or tribe Ovibovini) in the tribe Caprini (or subfamily Caprinae) of the subfamily Antilopinae in the family Bovidae. It is therefore more closely related to sheep and goats than to oxen; it is placed in its own genus, Ovibos (Latin: "sheep-ox"). It is one of the two largest extant members of the caprines, along with the similarly sized takin (Budorcas taxicolor).

While the takin and muskox were once considered possibly closely related, the takin lacks common ovibovine features, such as the muskox's specialised horn morphology, and genetic analysis shows that their lineages actually separated early in caprine evolution. Instead, the muskox's closest living relatives appear to be the gorals of the genus Naemorhedus, nowadays common in many countries of central and east Asia. The vague similarity between takin and muskox is therefore an example of convergent evolution.

=== Fossil history and extinct relatives ===
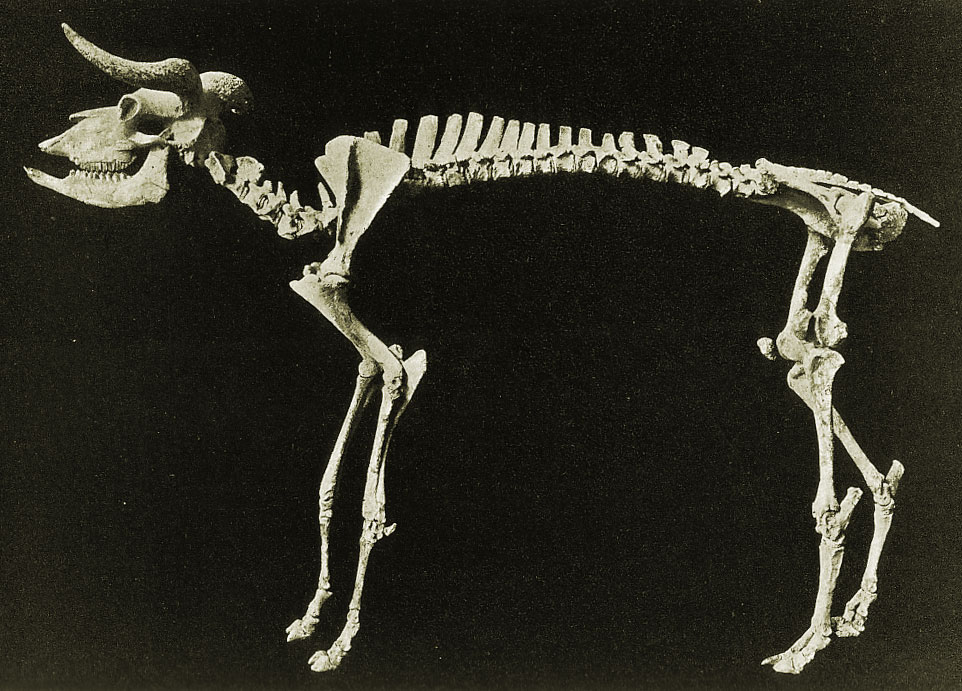
Euceratherium skeleton (missing its ribs)

The modern muskox is the last member of a line of ovibovines that first evolved in temperate regions of Asia and adapted to a cold tundra environment late in its evolutionary history. Muskox ancestors with sheep-like high-positioned horns (horn cores being mostly over the plane of the frontal bones, rather than below them as in modern muskoxen) first left the temperate forests for the developing grasslands of Central Asia during the Pliocene, expanding into Siberia and the rest of northern Eurasia.

Later migration waves of Asian ungulates that included high-horned muskoxen reached Europe and North America during the first half of the Pleistocene. The first well-known muskox, the "shrub-ox" Euceratherium, crossed to North America over an early version of Beringia, the Bering Land Bridge, two million years ago and prospered in the Southwestern United States and Mexico. Euceratherium was larger yet more lightly built than modern muskoxen, resembling a giant sheep with massive horns, and preferred hilly grasslands.

A genus with intermediate horns, Soergelia, inhabited Eurasia in the early Pleistocene, from Spain to Siberia, and crossed to North America during the Irvingtonian (1.8 million years to 240,000 years ago), soon after Euceratherium. Unlike Euceratherium, which survived in America until the Late Pleistocene extinctions during the Late Pleistocene to the early Holocene, Soergelia was a lowland dweller which disappeared fairly early, displaced by more advanced ungulates, such as the "giant muskox" Praeovibos (literally "before Ovibos"). The low-horned Praeovibos was present in Europe and the Mediterranean 1.5 million years ago, colonised Alaska and the Yukon one million years ago, and disappeared half a million years ago. Praeovibos was a highly adaptable animal apparently associated with cold tundra (reindeer) and temperate woodland (red deer) faunas alike.

During the Mindel glaciation 500,000 years ago, Praeovibos was present in the Kolyma river area in eastern Siberia in association with many megafauna of the Ice Age that would later coexist with Ovibos, in the Kolyma itself and elsewhere, including wild horses, reindeer, woolly mammoth and stag-moose. It is debated, however, if Praeovibos was directly ancestral to Ovibos, or both genera descended from a common ancestor, since the two occurred together during the Middle Pleistocene. Defenders of ancestry from Praeovibos have proposed that Praeovibos evolved into Ovibos in one region during a period of isolation and expanded later, replacing the remaining populations of Praeovibos.

Two more Praeovibos-like genera were named in America in the 19th century, Bootherium and Symbos, which are now identified as the male and female forms of a single, sexually dimorphic species, the "woodland muskox", Bootherium bombifrons. Bootherium inhabited open woodland areas of North America during the Late Pleistocene, from Alaska to Texas and maybe even Mexico, but was most common in the Southern United States, while Ovibos replaced it in the tundra-steppe to the north, immediately south of the Laurentide ice sheet.

Modern Ovibos appeared in Germany almost one million years ago and was common in the region through the Pleistocene. By the Mindel glaciation, muskoxen had also reached the British Isles. Both Germany and Britain were just south of the Scandinavian ice sheet and covered in tundra during cold periods, but Pleistocene muskoxen are also rarely recorded in more benign and wooded areas to the south like France and the Cantabrian Coast, also known as Green Spain, where they coexisted with temperate ungulates like red deer and aurochs. Likewise, the muskox is known to have survived in Britain during warm interglacial periods.

Today's muskoxen are descended from others believed to have migrated from Siberia to North America between 200,000 and 90,000 years ago, having previously occupied Alaska (at the time united to Siberia and isolated periodically from the rest of North America by the union of the Laurentide and Cordilleran ice sheets during colder periods) between 250,000 and 150,000 years ago.

After migrating south during one of the warmer periods of the Illinoian glaciation, non-Alaskan American muskoxen would be isolated from the rest in the colder periods. The muskox was already present in its current stronghold of Banks Island 34,000 years ago, but the existence of other ice-free areas in the Arctic Archipelago at the time is disputed.

Along with the bison and the pronghorn, the muskox was one of a few species of Pleistocene megafauna in North America to survive the Late Pleistocene extinctions of the Late Pleistocene to early Holocene and live to the present day. The muskox is thought to have been able to survive the Last Glacial Period by finding ice-free areas (refugia) away from prehistoric peoples.

Fossil DNA evidence suggests that muskoxen were not only more geographically widespread during the Pleistocene, but also more genetically diverse. During that time, other populations of muskoxen lived across the Arctic, from the Ural Mountains to Greenland. By contrast, the current genetic makeup of the species is more homogeneous. The shift in genetic diversity may have been affected by climate fluctuationss: research indicates colder periods in Earth's history are correlated with more diversity, and warmer periods with more homogeneity. Muskox populations survived into the Holocene in Siberia, with their youngest records in the region being from the Taymyr Peninsula, dating to around 2,700 years ago (~700 BC).

== Physical characteristics ==
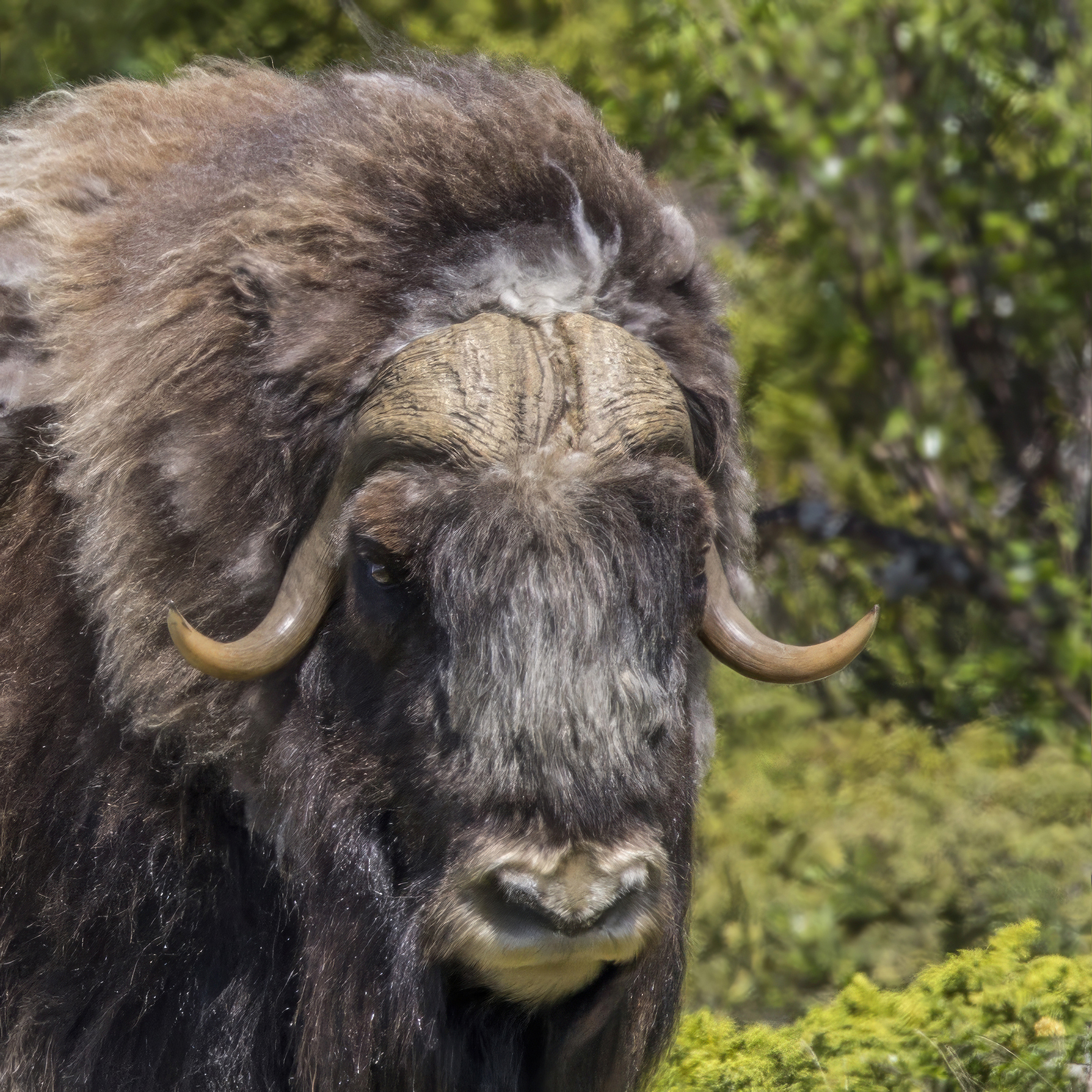

Both male and female muskoxen have long, curved horns. Muskoxen stand 1.1 to 1.5 metres (3 feet 7 inches to 4 feet 11 inches) high at the withers, with females measuring 135 to 200 cm (4 ft 5 in to 6 ft 7 in) in length, and the larger males 200 to 250 cm (6 ft 7 in to 8 ft 2 in). The small tail, often concealed under a layer of fur, measures only 10 cm (3.9 in) long. Adults, on average, weigh 285 kilograms (628 pounds), but can range from 180 to 410 kg (400 to 900 lb). The thick coat and large head suggest a larger animal than the muskox truly is; the bison, to which the muskox is often compared, can weigh up to twice as much. However, heavy zoo-kept specimens have weighed up to 650 kg (1,430 lb). Their coat, a mix of black, grey and brown, includes long guard hairs that almost reach the ground. Rare "white muskoxen" have been spotted in the Ahiak Migratory Bird Sanctuary.

Muskoxen are occasionally semi-domesticated for wool, and rarely for meat and milk. The U.S. state of Alaska has several muskoxen farms specifically aimed at wool harvesting. The wool, called qiviut, is highly prized for its softness, length, and insulation value.

A muskox can reach speeds of up to 60 kilometres per hour (37 miles per hour). Their life expectancy is between 12 and 20 years.

== Range ==
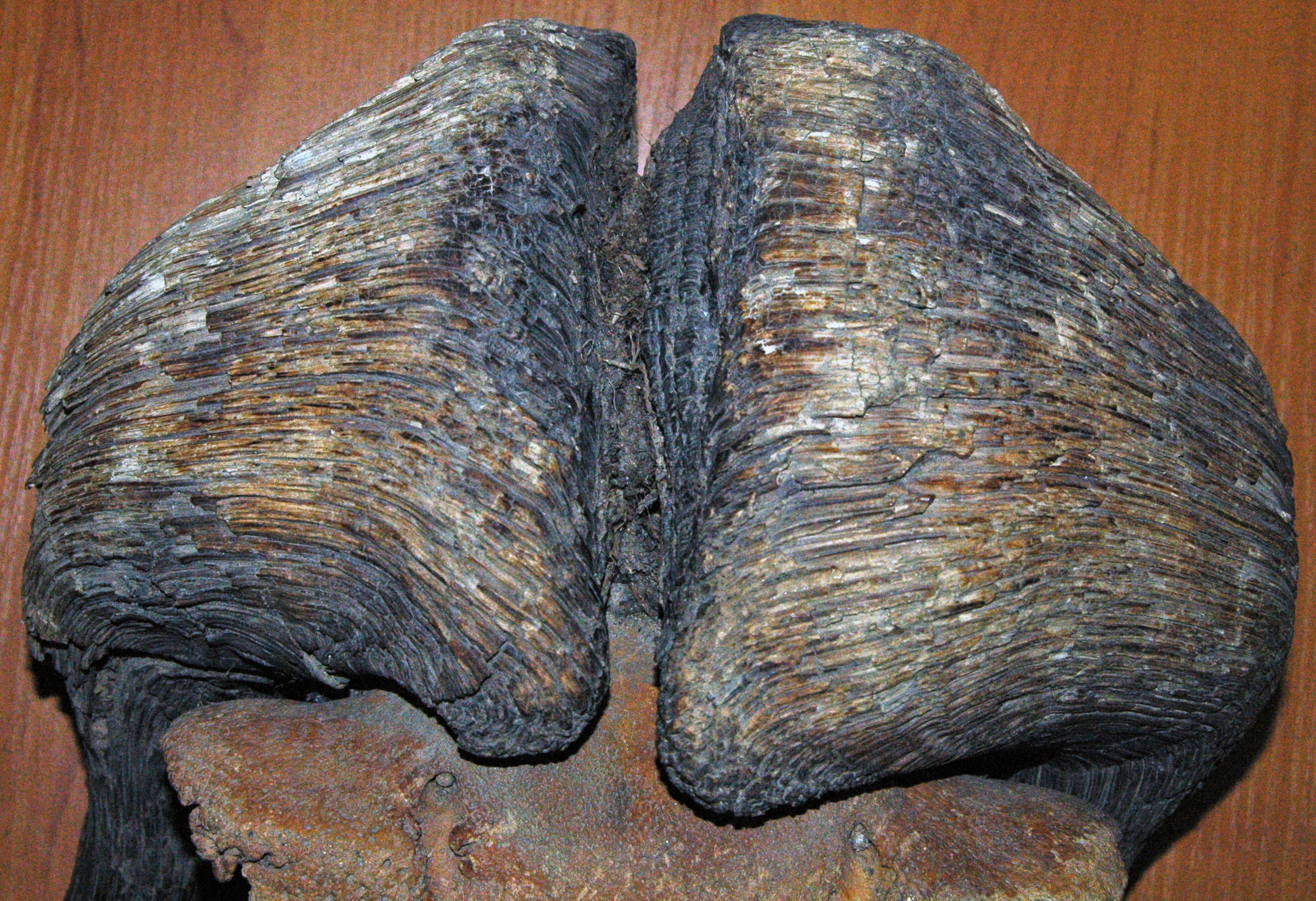
Fossil muskox skull from prehistoric Siberia

=== Prehistory ===
During the Pleistocene period, muskoxen were much more widespread. Fossil evidence shows that they were widespread across the Siberian and North American Arctic, from the Urals to Greenland. The ancestors of today's muskoxen came across the Bering Land Bridge to North America between 200,000 and 90,000 years ago.

During the Wisconsin glaciation, modern muskox thrived in the tundra south of the Laurentide ice sheet, in what is now the Midwestern United States, the Appalachian Mountains and Virginia, while distant relatives Bootherium and Euceratherium lived in the forests of the Southern United States and the western shrubland, respectively. Though they were always less common than other Ice Age megafauna, muskox abundance peaked during the Würm glaciation 20,000 years ago and declined afterwards, especially during the Late Pleistocene extinctions of the Late Pleistocene to early Holocene, where its range was greatly reduced and only the populations in North America survived. The last known muskox population in Europe died out in Sweden 9,000 years ago. In Asia, muskox persisted until just 615–555 BC in Tumat, Sakha Republic.

Following the disappearance of the Laurentide ice sheet, the muskox gradually moved north across the Arctic Archipelago, arriving in Greenland from Ellesmere Island at about 350 AD, during the late Holocene. Their arrival in northwestern Greenland probably occurred within a few hundred years of the arrival of the Dorset and Thule cultures in the present-day Qaanaaq area. Human predation around Qaanaaq may have restricted muskoxen from moving down the west coast, and instead kept them confined to the northeastern fringes of the island.

=== Recent native range in North America ===
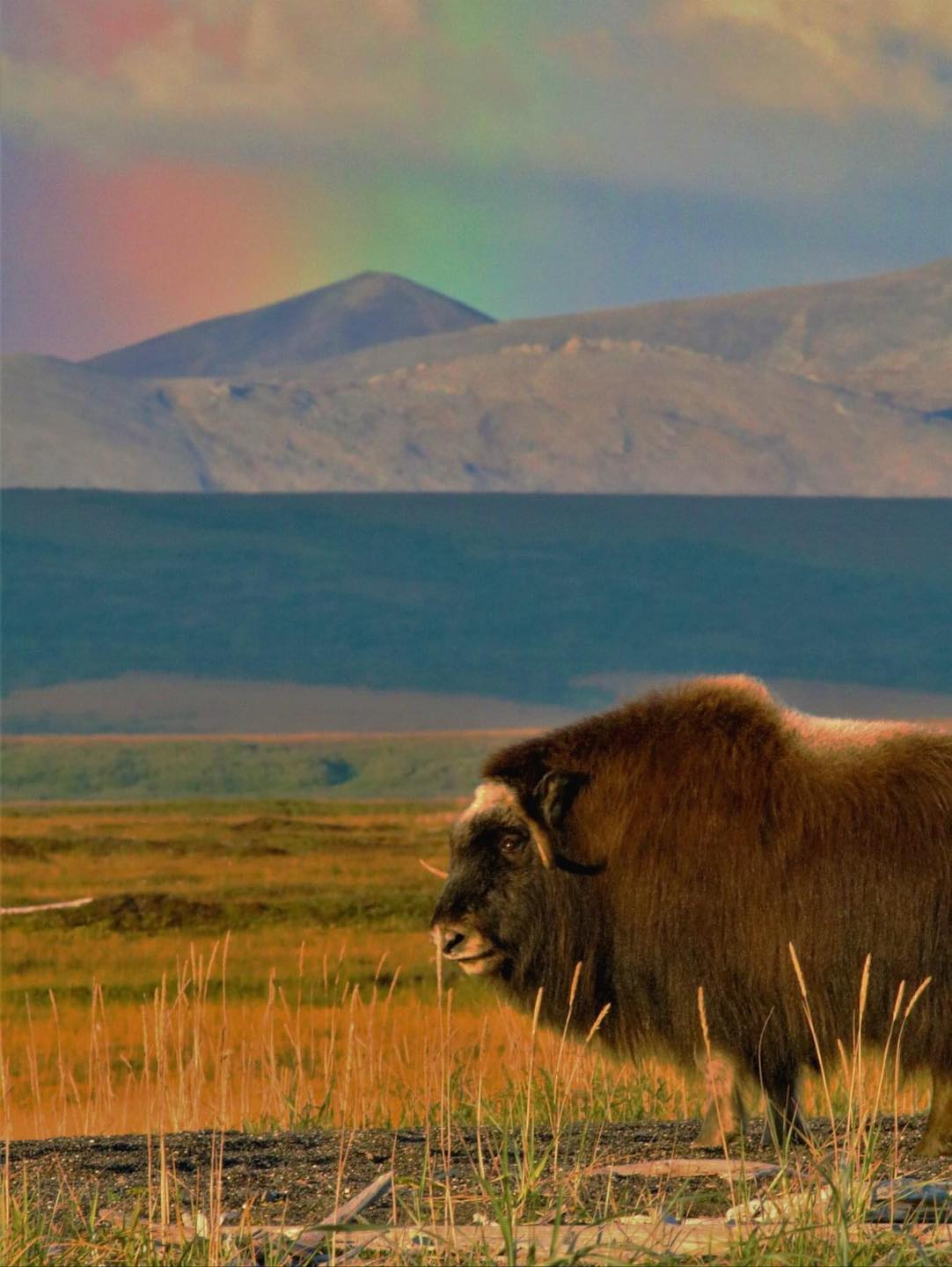
Muskox at Cape Krusenstern National Monument, Alaska

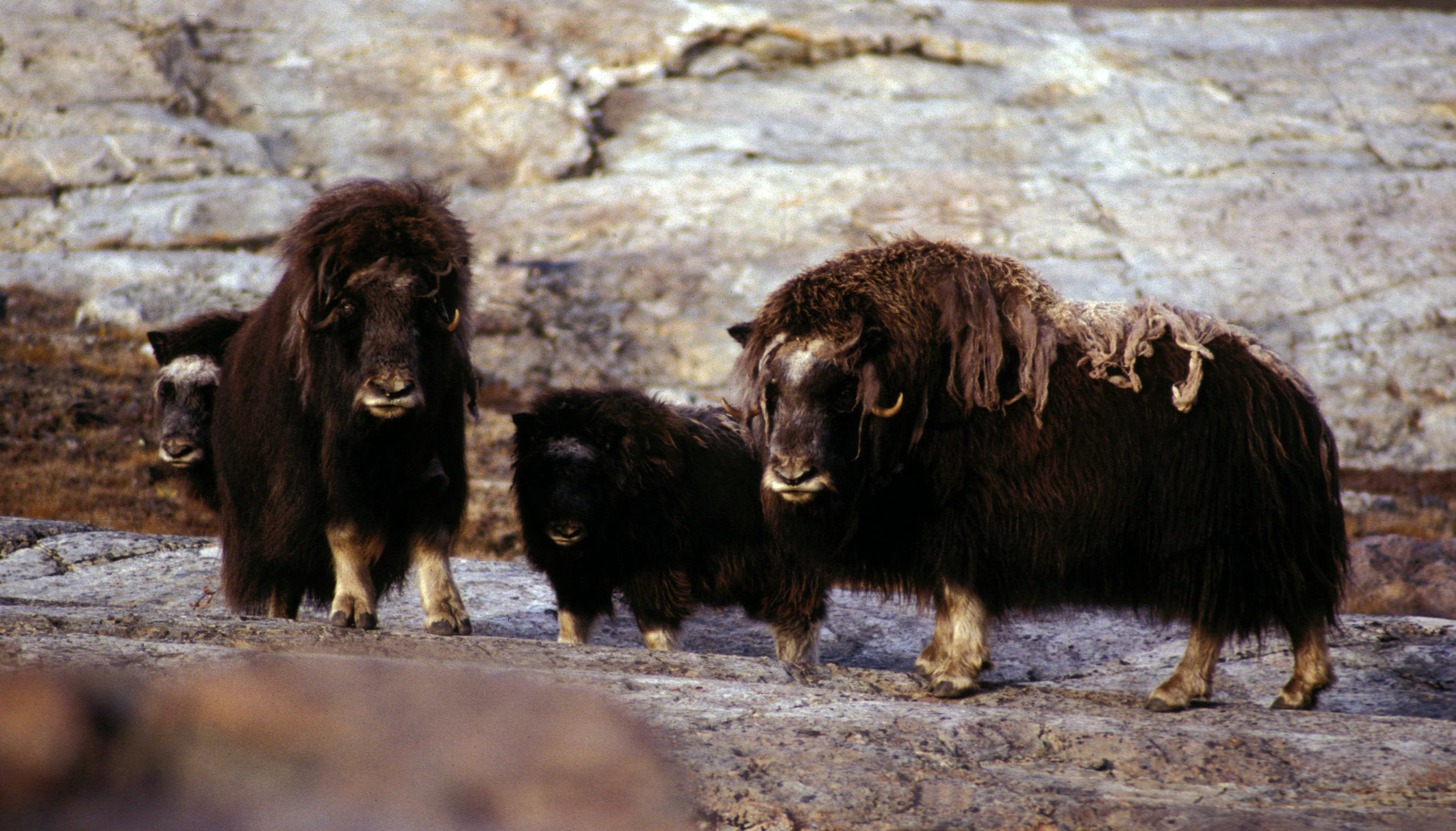
Muskox family in east Greenland

In modern times, muskoxen were restricted to the Arctic areas of northern Canada, Greenland, and Alaska. The Alaskan population was wiped out in the late 19th or early 20th century. Their depletion has been attributed to excessive hunting, but a changing climate may have contributed. However, muskoxen have since been reintroduced to Alaska. The United States Fish and Wildlife Service introduced the muskox onto Nunivak Island in 1935 to support subsistence living. Other reintroduced populations are in the Arctic National Wildlife Refuge, Bering Land Bridge National Preserve, Yukon's Ivvavik National Park, the Alaska Wildlife Conservation Center in Anchorage, Alaska, Aulavik National Park in the Northwest Territories, Kanuti National Wildlife Refuge, Gates of the Arctic National Park, and Whitehorse, Yukon's wildlife preserve.

There have been at least two domestication endeavours. In the 1950s, a U.S. researcher and adventurer successfully captured muskox calves in northern Canada for relocation to a property he prepared in Vermont. One condition imposed by the Canadian government was that he was not allowed to kill adults defending their young. When nets and ropes proved useless, he and his crew herded family groups into open water, where calves were successfully separated from the adults. Once air freighted to Montreal and trucked to Vermont, the young animals habituated to the temperate conditions. Although the calves thrived and grew to adulthood, parasite and disease resistance impaired the overall success of the effort. The surviving herd was eventually moved to a farm in Palmer, Alaska, where it has been successful since the mid-1950s.

=== Reintroductions in Eurasia ===
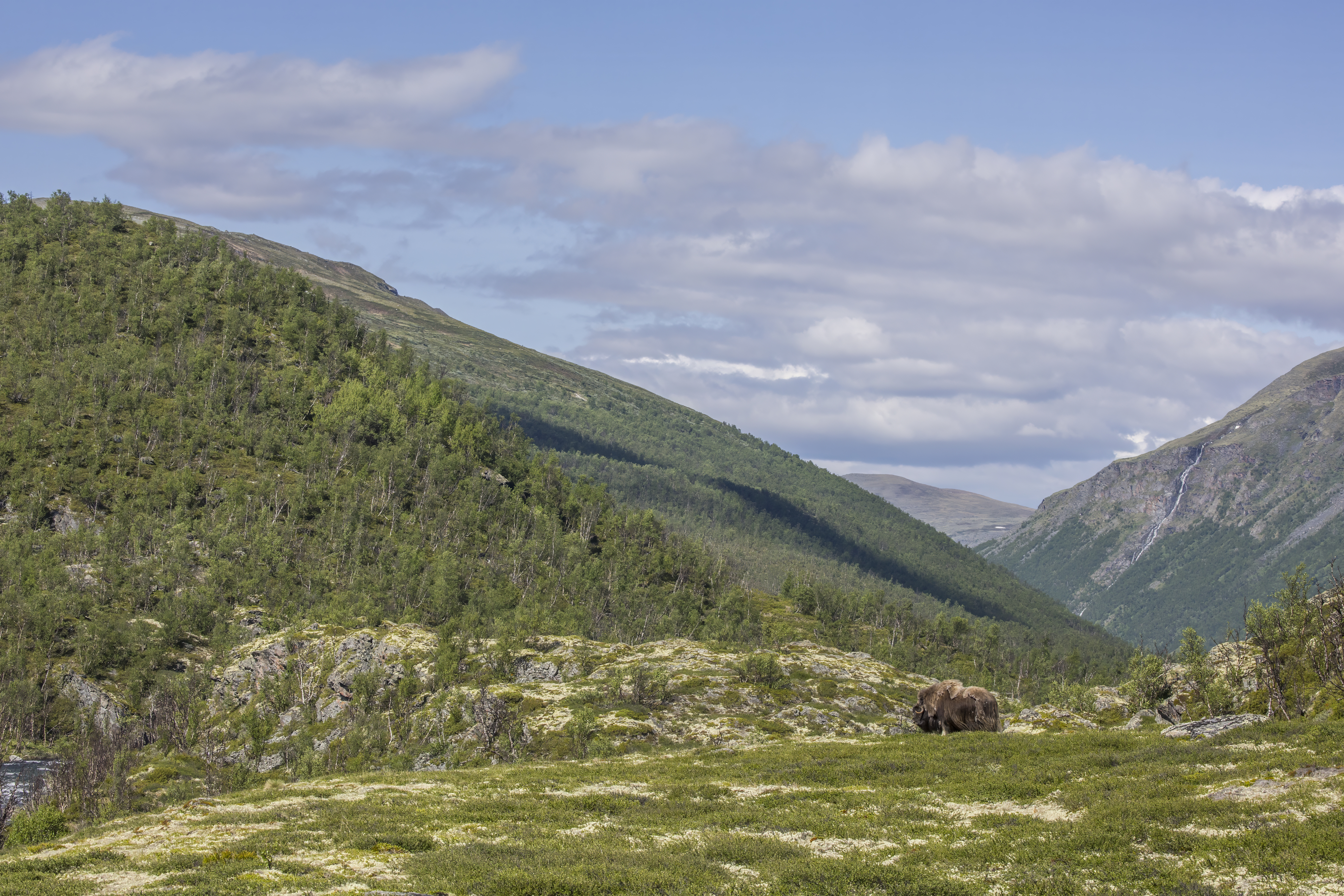
Male in Dovrefjell–Sunndalsfjella National Park, Norway

In 1913, workers building a railway over Dovrefjell found two fossil muskox vertebrae. This led to the idea of introducing muskoxen to Norway from Greenland. The first release in the world was made on Gurskøya, near Ålesund, in 1925–26. They were muskoxen caught by Norwegian seal-hunting boats in Greenland. The animals colonized the island, but eventually died out there. An attempt to introduce the muskox to Svalbard also failed. Seventeen animals were released in 1929 by Adventfjorden on Spitsbergen, known then as West Spitsbergen. In 1940, the herd numbered 50, but in the 1970s, the whole herd disappeared. In September 1932, polar researcher Adolf Hoel conducted another experiment, importing 10 muskoxen to Dovrefjell. This herd survived until World War II, when they were hunted and exterminated. In 1947 and later, new animals were released. A small group of muskoxen from Dovrefjell migrated across the national border to Sweden in 1971 and established themselves in Härjedalen, whereby a Swedish herd was established.

The Norwegian population on Dovrefjell is managed over an area of 340 km^{2} (130 sq mi) and in the summer of 2012 consisted of approximately 300 animals. Since 1999, the population has mostly been increasing, but in the summer and autumn of 2004, the Dovrefjell population experienced an outbreak of contagious ecthyma (orf), a disease caused by a parapoxvirus. Nineteen animals—18 calves and one yearling were documented as having been affected and 16 were euthanized.

Some animals are also occasionally killed as a result of train collisions on the Dovre Line. The population is divided into flocks in the Nystuguhø area, Kolla area and Hjerkinn. In the summer, they move down towards Driva, where there are lush grass pastures.

Although the muskox's typical habitat is dry Arctic grassland, it seems to thrive on Dovrefjell. However, the pastures are marginal, with little grass available in winter, and inbreeding depression over time is expected in such a small population.

In addition to the population on Dovrefjell, The Arctic University of Norway (University of Tromsø) had some animals on Ryøya outside Tromsø until 2018.

Muskoxen were introduced to Svalbard in 1925–26 and 1929, but this population died out in the 1970s. They were also introduced in Iceland around 1930 but did not survive.

In Russia, animals imported from Banks and Nunivak islands were released in the Taymyr Peninsula in 1974 and 1975, and some from Nunivak were released in Wrangel Island in 1975. Both locations are north of the Arctic Circle. By 2019, the population on Wrangel Island was about 1,100, and the Taymyr Peninsula, about 11,000–14,000. A few muskoxen herds migrated from the Taymyr Peninsula far to the south to the Putorana Plateau. Once established, these populations have been, in turn, used as sources for further reintroductions in Siberia between 1996 and 2010. One of the last of these actions was the release of six animals within the Pleistocene Park project area in the Kolyma River in 2010, where a team of Russian scientists led by Sergey Zimov aims to prove that muskoxen, along with other Pleistocene megafauna that survived into the early Holocene in northern Siberia, did not disappear from the region due to climate change, but because of hunting by humans.

=== Introductions in eastern Canada ===
Ancient muskox remains have never been found in eastern Canada, although the ecological conditions in the northern Labrador Peninsula are suitable for them. In 1967, 14 animals were captured near Eureka on Ellesmere Island by the Institute for Northern Agricultural Research (INAR) and brought to a farm in Kuujjuaq (Fort Chimo), in the Nunavik of northern Quebec, for domestication to provide a local cottage industry based on qiviut, a fine natural fibre. The animals thrived, and the qiviut industry showed early success with the training of Inuit knitters and marketing, but it soon became clear that the provincial government of Quebec had never intended that the muskoxen be domesticated, but had used INAR to capture muskoxen to provide a wild population for hunting.

Government officials demanded that INAR leave Quebec and the farm be closed. Subsequently, 54 animals from the farm were released in three places in northern Quebec between 1973 and 1983, and the remaining were ceded to local zoos. Between 1983 and 1986, the released animals increased from 148 to 290, at a rate of 25% per year, and by 2003, an estimated 1,400 muskoxen were in Quebec. Additionally, 112 adults and 25 calves were counted in the nearby Diana Island in 2005, having arrived there by their own means from the mainland. Vagrant adults are sometimes spotted in Labrador, though no herds have been observed in the region.

== Ecology ==
During the summer, muskoxen live in wet areas, such as river valleys, moving to higher elevations in the winter to avoid deep snow. Muskoxen will eat grasses, Arctic willows, woody plants, lichens and mosses. When food is abundant, they prefer succulent and nutritious grasses in an area. Willows are the most commonly eaten plants in the winter. Muskoxen require a high threshold of fat reserves in order to conceive, which reflects their conservative breeding strategy. Winter ranges typically have shallow snow to reduce the energy costs of digging through snow to reach forage. The primary predators of muskoxen are Arctic wolves, which may account for up to half of all mortality for the species. Other occasional predators, likely mainly predators of calves or infirm adults, can include grizzly bears and polar bears and wolverines.

== Physiology ==
Muskox are heterothermic mammals, meaning they can shut off thermoregulation in some parts of their body, like their lower limbs. Maintaining the lower limbs at a cooler temperature than the rest of their body helps reduce the loss of body heat from their extremities. Muskox display the unique characteristic of having hemoglobin that is three times less temperature sensitive than human hemoglobin. This temperature insensitivity allows the muskox's hemoglobin to have a heightened oxygen affinity in an extremely cold environment and continue to diffuse high amounts of oxygen into its cold tissues.

== Social behaviour and reproduction ==
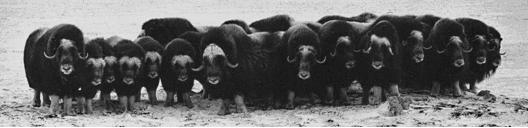
Nunivak Island, Alaskan muskoxen in the 1930s, shown here in defensive formation

Muskoxen live in herds of 12–24 in the winter and 8–20 in the summer when dominant bulls expel other males from the herd. They do not hold territories, but they do mark their trails with preorbital glands. Male and female muskoxen have separate age-based hierarchies, with mature oxen being dominant over juveniles. Dominant oxen tend to get access to the best resources and will displace subordinates from patches of grass during the winter.

Muskox bulls assert their dominance in many different ways. One is a "rush and butt", in which a dominant bull rushes a subordinate from the side with its horns, and warns the subordinate so it can have a chance to get away. Bulls will also roar, swing their heads, and paw the ground. Dominant bulls sometimes treat subordinate bulls like cows. A dominant bull will tap a subordinate with its foreleg, something they do to cows during mating. Dominant bulls will also mock copulate subordinates and sniff their genitals. A subordinate bull can challenge his status by charging a dominant bull.

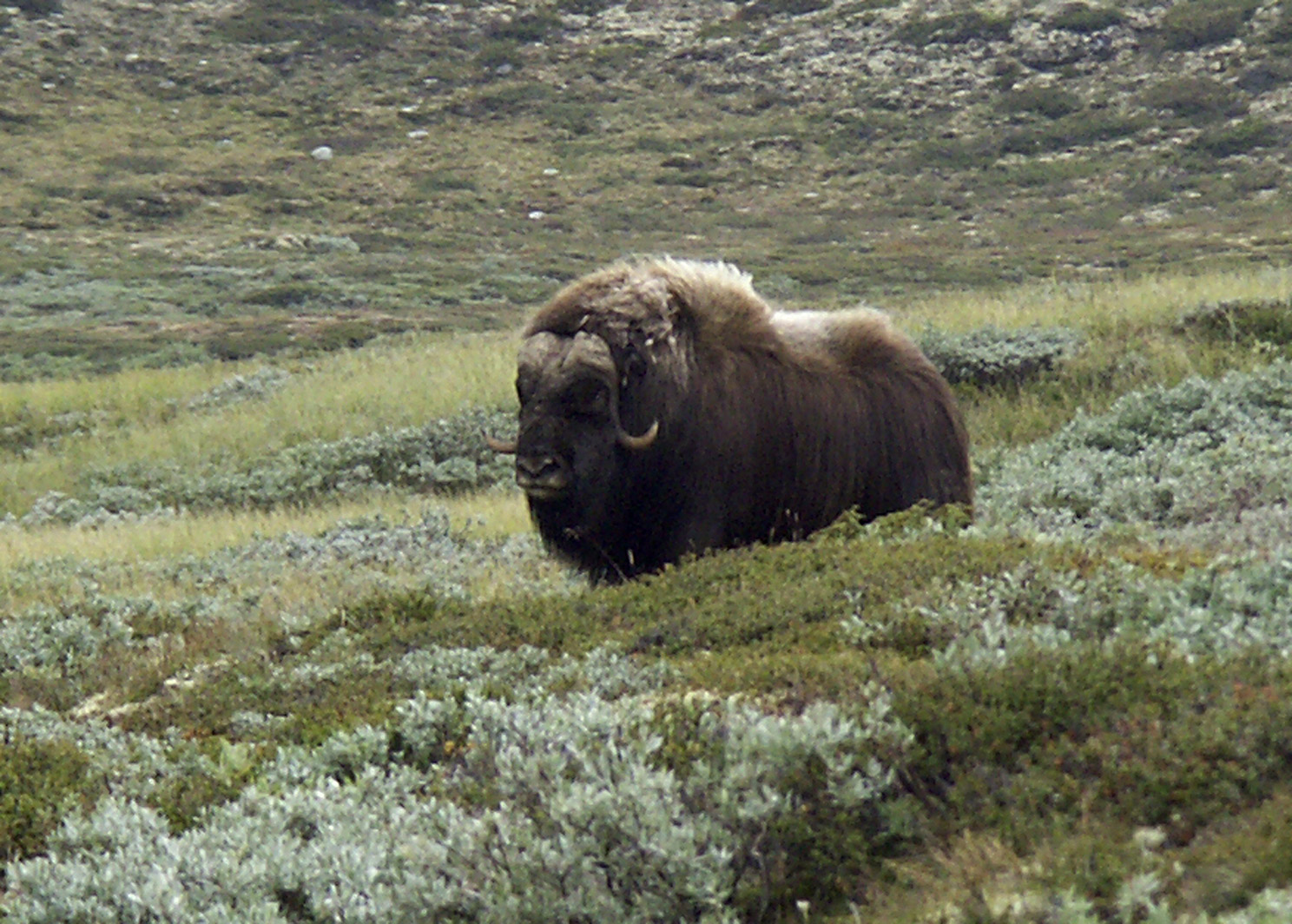
Muskox in Dovrefjell-Sunndalsfjella National Park, Norway

The mating ("rutting") season of the muskoxen begins in late June or early July. During this time, dominant bulls will fight others out of the herds and establish harems of usually six or seven cows and their offspring. Fighting bulls will first rub their preorbital glands against their legs while bellowing loudly, and then display their horns. The bulls then back up about 20 m (66 ft), lower their heads, and charge into each other, and will keep doing so until one bull gives up. Subordinate and elderly bulls will leave the herds to form bachelor groups or become solitary. However, when danger is present, the outside bulls can return to the herd for protection. Dominant bulls will prevent cows from leaving their harems. During mating, a bull will tap an estrous cow with his foreleg to calm her down and make her more receptive to his advances. The herds reassemble when summer ends.

While the bulls are more aggressive during the rutting season and lead their groups, the females take charge during gestation. Pregnant females are aggressive and decide what distance the herd travels in a day and where they will bed for the night. The herds move more often when cows are lactating, to let them get enough food to nurse their offspring. Cows have an eight- to nine-month gestation period, with calving occurring from April to June. Cows do not calve every year. When winters are severe, cows will not go into estrus and thus will not calve the next year. When calving, cows stay in the herd for protection. Muskox are precocial, and calves can keep up with the herd within just a few hours after birth. The calves are welcomed into the herd and nursed for the first two months. After that, a calf then begins eating vegetation and nurses only occasionally. Cows communicate with their calves through braying. The calf's bond with its mother weakens after two years.

Muskoxen have a distinctive defensive behaviour: when the herd is threatened, the adults will face outward to form a stationary ring or semicircle around the calves. The bulls are usually the front line for defence against predators, with the cows and juveniles gathering close to them. Bulls determine the defensive formation during rutting, while the cows decide the rest of the year.

=== Components of glandular secretions ===
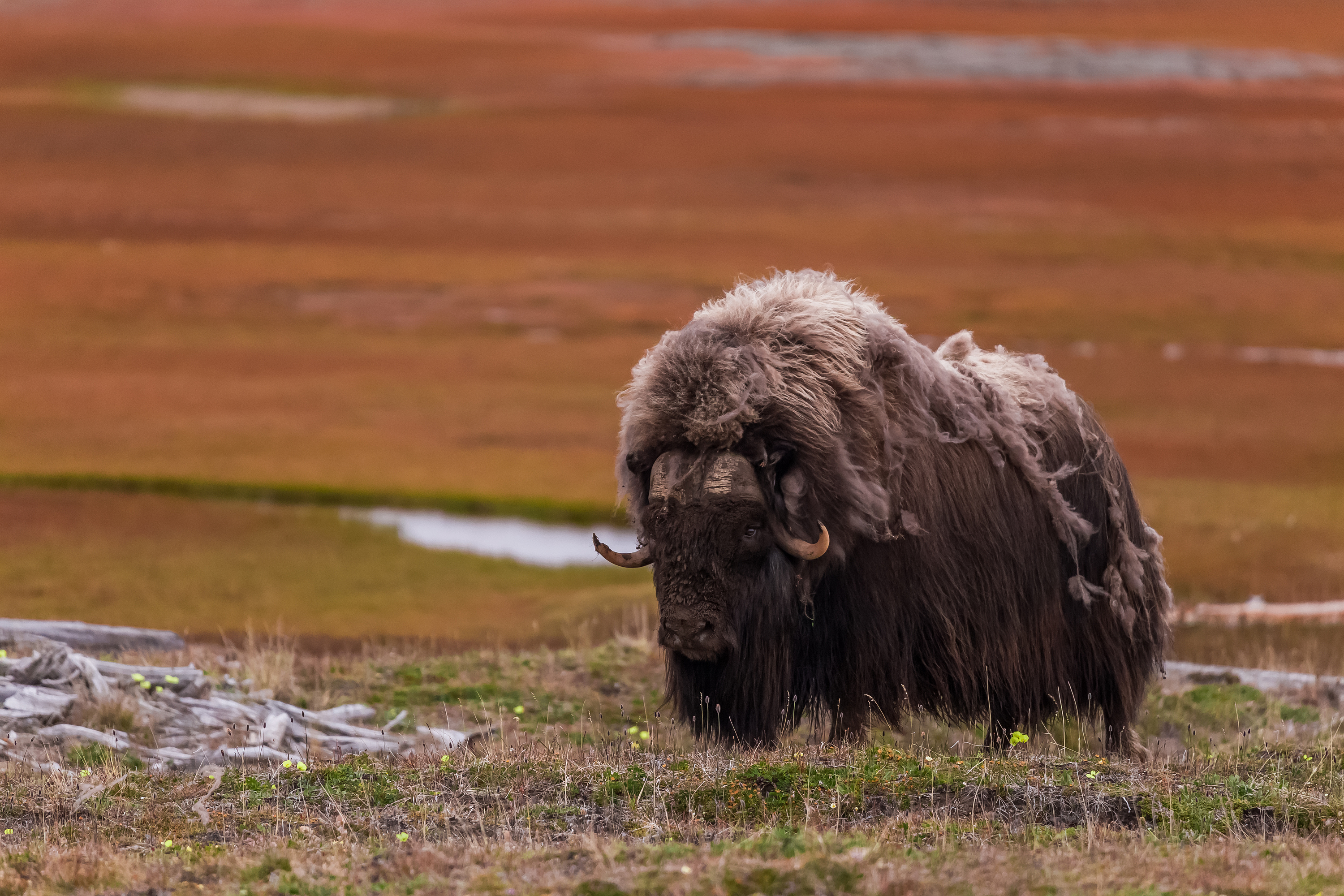
Muskox on Bolshoy Begichev Island, Russia

The preorbital gland secretion of muskoxen has a "light, sweetish, ethereal" odour. Analysis of preorbital gland secretion extract showed the presence of cholesterol (which is nonvolatile), benzaldehyde, a series of straight-chain saturated γ-lactones ranging from C_{8}H_{14}O_{2} to C_{12}H_{22}O_{2} (with C_{10}H_{18}O_{2} being most abundant), and probably the monounsaturated γ-lactone C_{12}H_{20}O_{2}. The saturated γ-lactone series has an odour similar to that of the secretion.

The odour of dominant rutting males is described as "strong" and "rank". It derives from the preputial gland and is distributed over the fur of the abdomen via urine. Analysis of extract of washes of the prepuce revealed the presence of benzoic acid and p-cresol, along with a series of straight-chain saturated hydrocarbons from C_{22}H_{46} to C_{32}H_{66} (with C_{24}H_{50} being most abundant).

=== Danger to humans ===
Muskoxen are not known to be aggressive. Fatal attacks are extremely rare, but humans who have come close and behaved aggressively have occasionally been attacked.

On 22 July 1964, a 73-year-old man was killed in a muskox attack in Norway. Local authorities later killed the animal.

On 13 December 2022, a court services officer with the U.S. Alaska State Troopers was killed by a muskox near Nome, Alaska. The officer was trying to scare away a group of muskox near a dog kennel at his home when one of the animals attacked him.

== Conservation status ==
Historically, this species declined because of over hunting, but populations have recovered following the enforcement of hunting regulations. Management in the late 1900s was mostly conservative hunting quotas to foster recovery and recolonisation from the historic declines. The current world population of muskoxen is estimated at between 80,000 and 125,000, with an estimated 47,000 living on Banks Island, Canada.

In Greenland, there are no major threats. However, populations are often small in size and scattered; this makes them vulnerable to local fluctuations in climate. Most populations are within national parks, where they are protected from hunting. Muskoxen occur in four of Greenland's protected areas, with indigenous populations in Northeast Greenland National Park and introduced populations in Arnangarnup Qoorua Nature Reserve and Kangerlussuaq and Maniitsoq Caribou Reserves. In these areas, muskoxen receive full protection.

Muskoxen are being domesticated for the production of qiviut.
