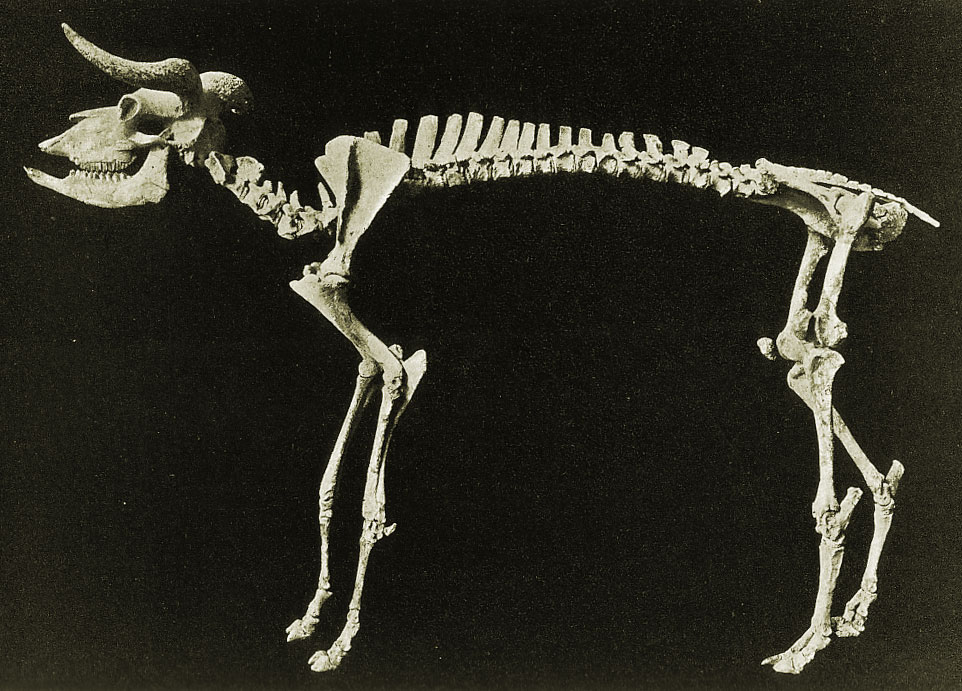
- Mounted skeleton (with missing ribs)

Scientific classification
- Kingdom: Animalia
- Phylum: Chordata
- Class: Mammalia
- Order: Artiodactyla
- Family: Bovidae
- Subfamily: Caprinae
- Tribe: Ovibovini
- Genus: †Euceratherium; Furlong & Sinclair, 1904

Type species
- †Euceratherium collinum Furlong & Sinclair, 1904

Other species
- †Euceratherium bizzelli Stovall, 1937

Synonyms
- Aftonius calvini Hay, 1913; Preptoceras sinclairi Furlong, 1905

= Euceratherium =

Shrubox Temporal range: Early Pleistocene to Late Pleistocene 1.1–0.013 Ma

Extinct genus of mammals

Euceratherium, also called the shrubox, is an extinct genus of ovibovine caprine known from the Pleistocene of North America and China. Two species have been proposed: the type species Euceratherium collinum named in 1904, and a second species Euceratherium bizzelli, named in 1937. Some researchers have expressed that the differences between these species may actually be individual variation, or variation within a single species.

== Taxonomy ==
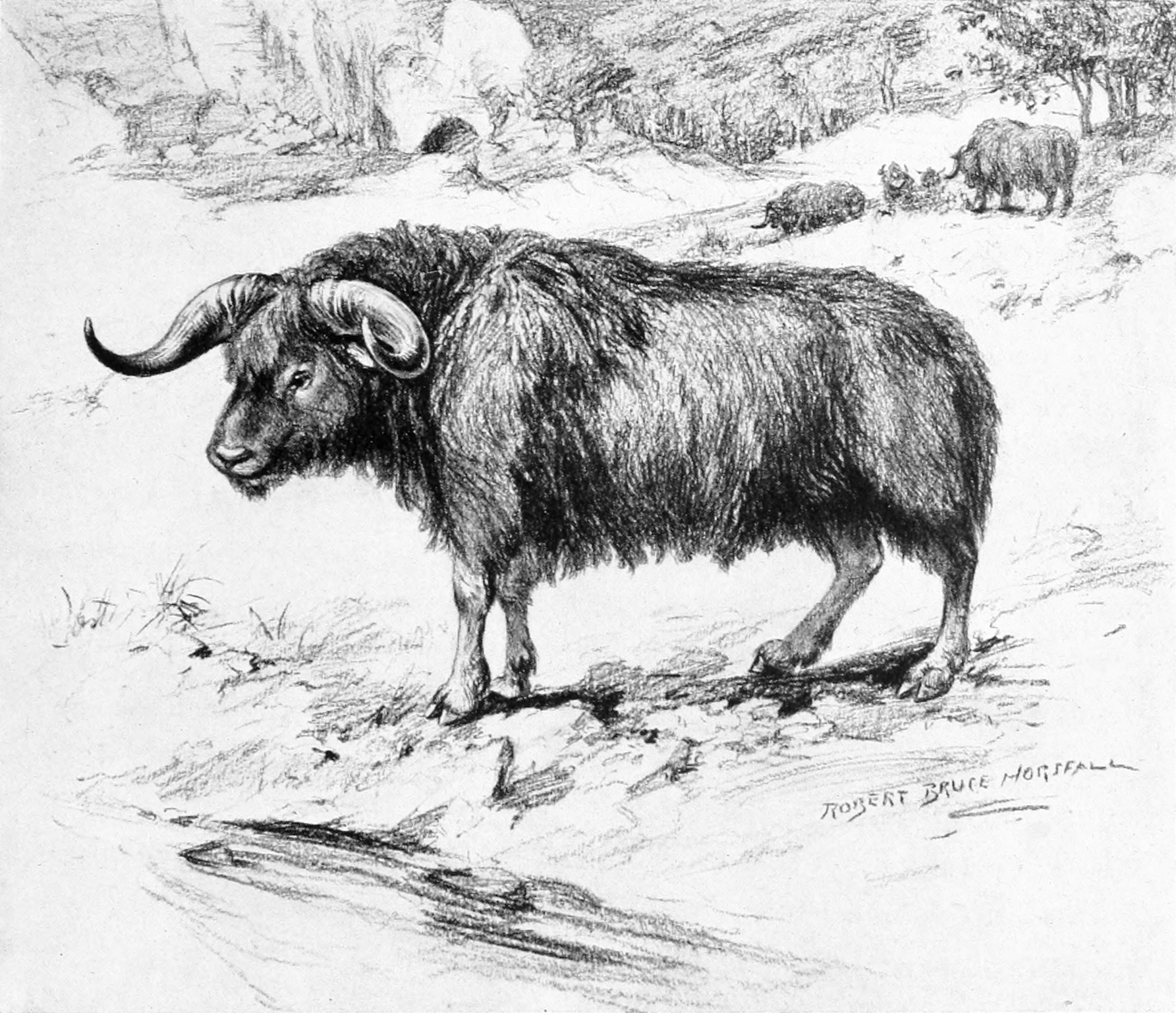
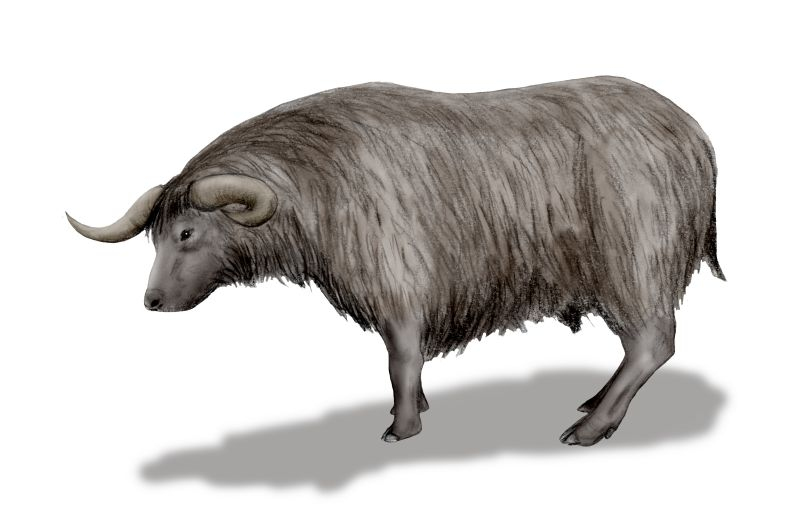
Life restoration from 1913 by Robert Bruce Horsfall (top) and modern restoration (bottom) of E. collinum

Euceratherium collinum was formally described in 1904. The species is considered to be closely related to the living muskox, as well as extinct genera like Bootherium.

== Distribution ==
The earliest fossils of the genus are known from the Early Pleistocene of China, from which it then migrated into North America. Late Pleistocene shrubox remains are known from fossil finds spanning from what is now Northern California to Guatemala. Alongside the fellow extinct ovibovine Speleotherium, it is one of the southernmost known caprines in North America.

== Description ==
Euceratherium has been estimated to weight approximately 450 kilograms (990 lb).

== Ecology ==
Based on preserved dung pellets, it has been established that Euceratherium was a browser with a diet of trees and shrubs. They seem to have preferred hilly landscapes.
