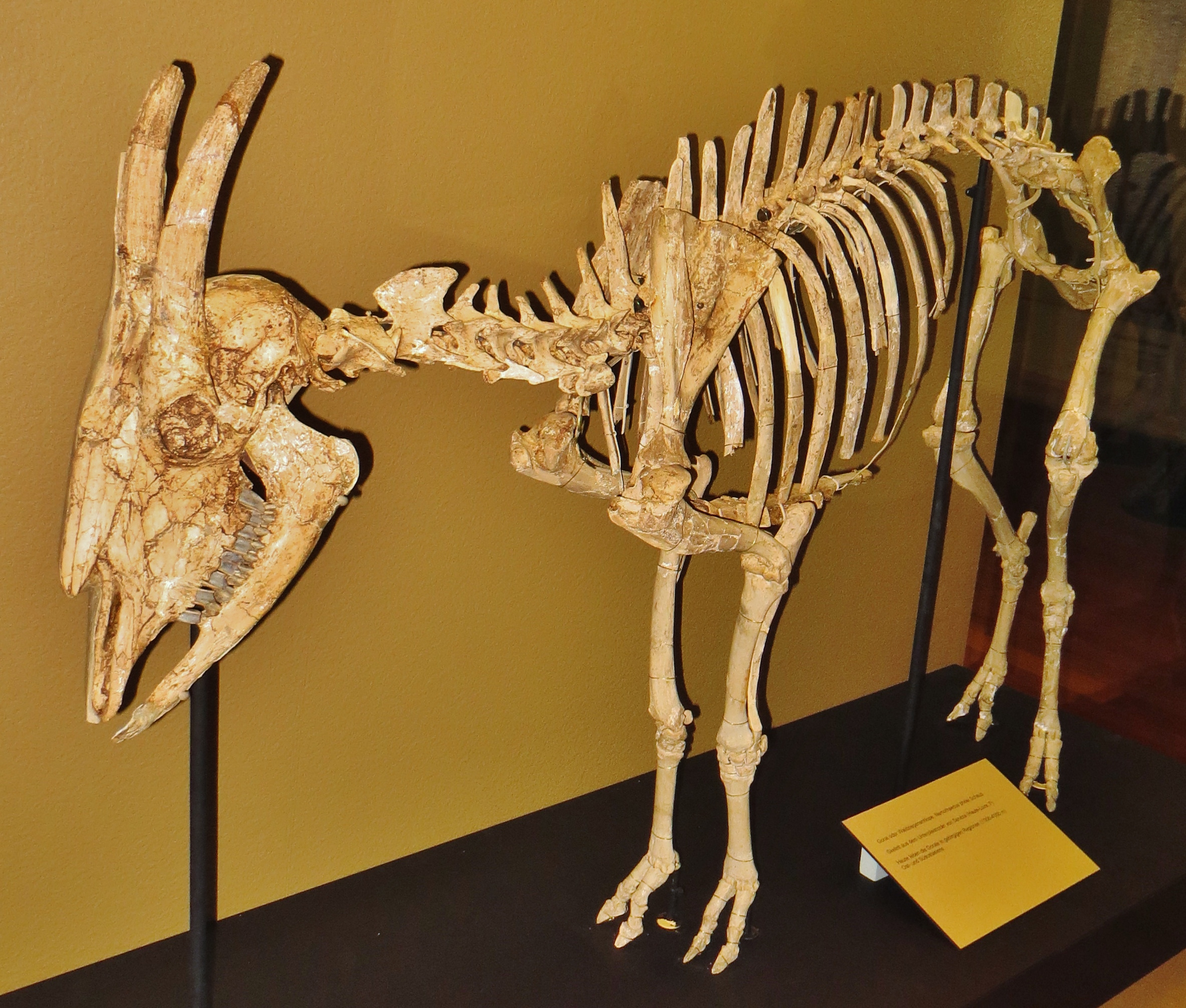
- Fossil of Gallogoral meneghinii at Natural History Museum of Basel

Scientific classification
- Kingdom: Animalia
- Phylum: Chordata
- Class: Mammalia
- Order: Artiodactyla
- Family: Bovidae
- Subfamily: Caprinae
- Genus: †Gallogoral; Guérin, 1965

Species
- †G. meneghinii Guérin, 1965

= Gallogoral =

Gallogoral Temporal range: Pliocene-Pleistocene

Extinct genus of caprine bovid

Gallogoral is an extinct genus of caprine bovid that lived in Europe during the Pliocene and Pleistocene epochs.

== Geographic range ==
The species G. meneghinii has been found in France, Italy, Greece, Russia, and Georgia.

== Palaeoecology ==
Fossil remains from Coste San Giacomo, dating to about 2.1 Ma, show G. meneghinii to have been a mixed feeder. However, remains from the site of Olivola dating to around the time of the Gelasian-Calabrian transition instead suggest that G. meneghinii was a grazer, as evidenced by its dental wear showing signs of heavy consumption of grass, grit, and dust. It had a preference for mountainous habitats.
