= Turcocerus =

Turcocerus Temporal range: Neogene

Scientific classification
- Kingdom: Animalia
- Phylum: Chordata
- Class: Mammalia
- Order: Artiodactyla
- Family: Bovidae
- Genus: †Turcocerus; Köhler, 1988

Extinct genus of mammals

Turcocerus is an extinct genus of caprine bovid that lived in Eurasia during the Neogene period.

== Distribution ==
T. gracilis is known from Turkey. T. halamagaiensis inhabited the Junggar Basin of China. T. africanus is known from Kenya.
