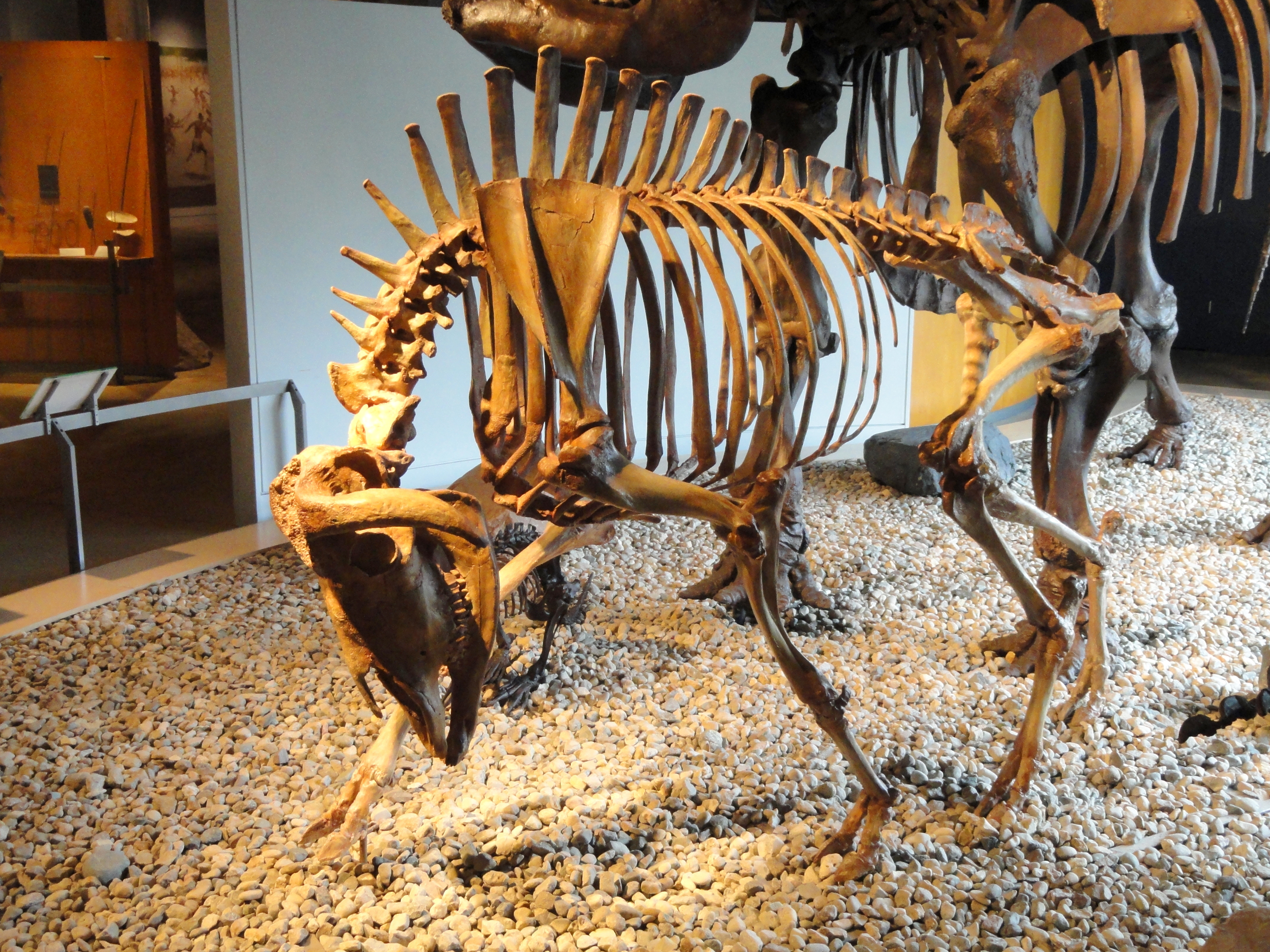

Scientific classification
- Kingdom: Animalia
- Phylum: Chordata
- Class: Mammalia
- Order: Artiodactyla
- Family: Bovidae
- Subfamily: Caprinae
- Tribe: Ovibovini
- Genus: †Bootherium; Leidy, 1852
- Species: †B. bombifrons

Binomial name
- †Bootherium bombifrons (Harlan, 1825)

Synonyms
- Symbos cavifrons

= Bootherium =

Bootherium Temporal range: middle to late Pleistocene, 0.781–0.012 Ma

Extinct genus of bovid mammal

Bootherium is an extinct bovid genus from the Middle to Late Pleistocene of North America which contains a single species, Bootherium bombifrons. Vernacular names for Bootherium include Harlan's muskox, woodox, woodland muskox, helmeted muskox, or bonnet-headed muskox.

== Taxonomy ==
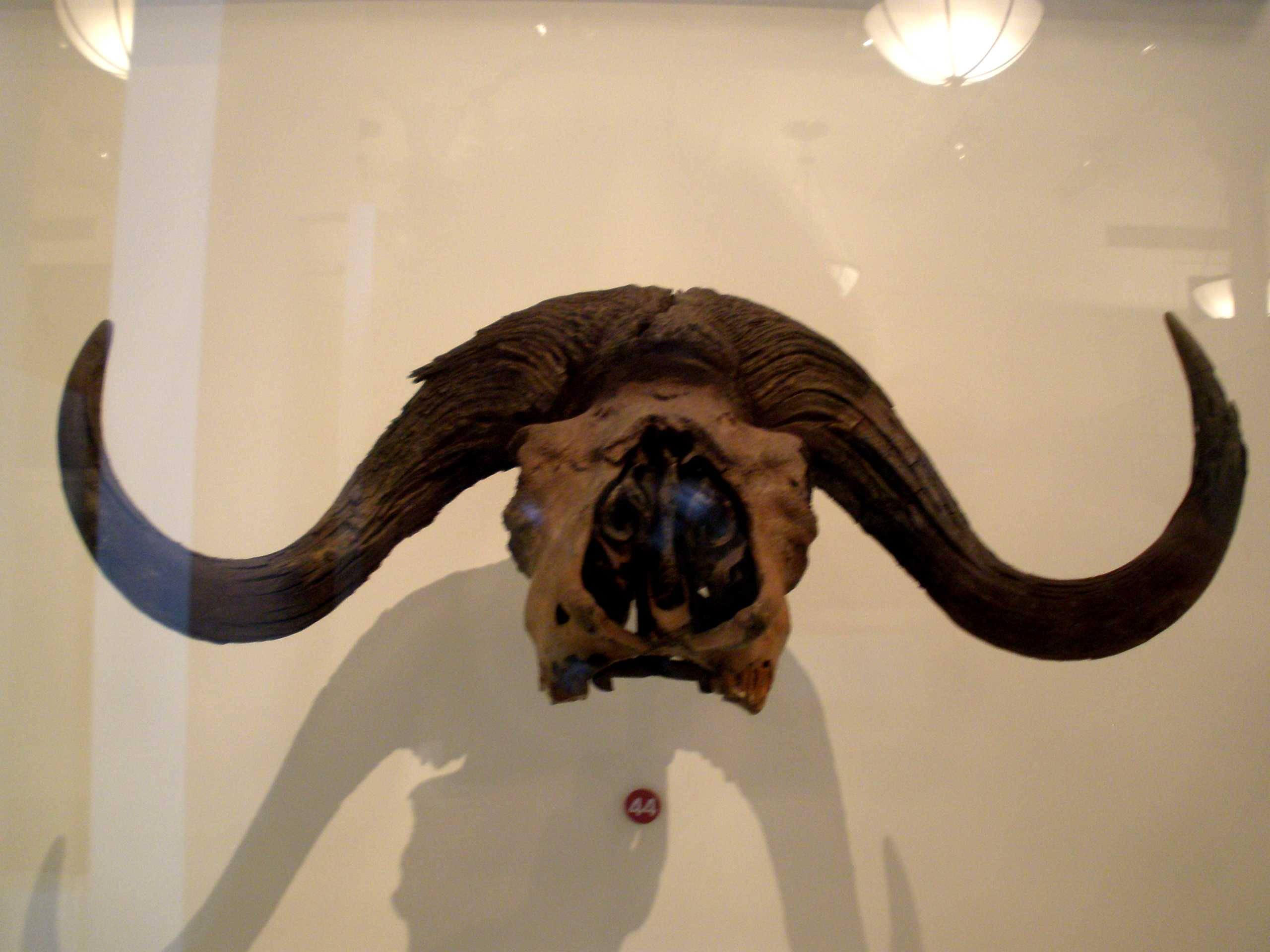
Skull

Symbos was formerly thought to be a separate genus, but is now known to be synonymous. Its closest living relative is the muskox (Ovibos moschatus), from which it diverged around 3 million years ago. It is also closely related to the contemporaneous extinct genus Euceratherium.

== Description ==
Unlike today's Arctic and tundra-adapted muskoxen, with their long, shaggy coats, Bootherium was physically adapted to a range of less frigid climates, and appears to have been the only species of muskox to have evolved in and remain restricted to the North American continent (the Arctic muskox's range is circumpolar, and includes the northern reaches of Eurasia as well as North America). Bootherium was significantly taller and leaner than muskoxen found today in Arctic regions. Bootherium were estimated to weigh around 423.5 kg (934 lb). Other differences were a thicker skull and considerably longer snout. The horns of Bootherium were situated high on the skull, with a downward curve and were fused along the midline of the skull, unlike tundra muskoxen whose horns are separated by a medial groove.

== Distribution ==
Bootherium was one of the most widely distributed muskox species in North America during the Pleistocene epoch. Fossils have been documented from as far north as Alaska to Alberta, Montana, California, Utah, Texas, Missouri, Indiana, Ohio, Michigan, Oklahoma, Virginia, North Carolina, and New Jersey. The species went into decline, and eventual extinction, approximately 11,000 years ago, at the end of the last Ice Age.
