= Nesogoral =

Nesogoral Temporal range: Pliocene–Early Pleistocene

Scientific classification
- Kingdom: Animalia
- Phylum: Chordata
- Class: Mammalia
- Order: Artiodactyla
- Family: Bovidae
- Subfamily: Caprinae
- Genus: †Nesogoral; Gliozzi & Malatesta, 1980

Species
- Nesogoral cenisae van der Made, 2005; Nesogoral melonii (Dehaut, 1911)

Extinct genus of mammals

Nesogoral is an extinct genus of goat-antelope that was endemic to the island of Sardinia during the Pliocene and Early Pleistocene epochs.
