= Palaeoreas =

Scientific classification
- Kingdom: Animalia
- Phylum: Chordata
- Class: Mammalia
- Order: Artiodactyla
- Family: Bovidae
- Genus: †Palaeoreas; Gaudry, 1861

Species
- Palaeoreas lindermayeri Wagner, 1848; Palaeoreas sinensis Schlosser, 1903

Extinct genus of mammals

Palaeoreas was a genus of Miocene bovid from Europe.

== Geographic range ==
Palaeoreas lindermayeri fossils have been found in Bulgaria and Greece.

== Palaeoecology ==
Based on fossils from Pikermi and Samos, P. lindermayeri is believed to have had a browsing feeding style. However, dental wear patterns on P. lindermayeri remains from northern Greece instead show it to have been a variable grazer or mixed feeder.
