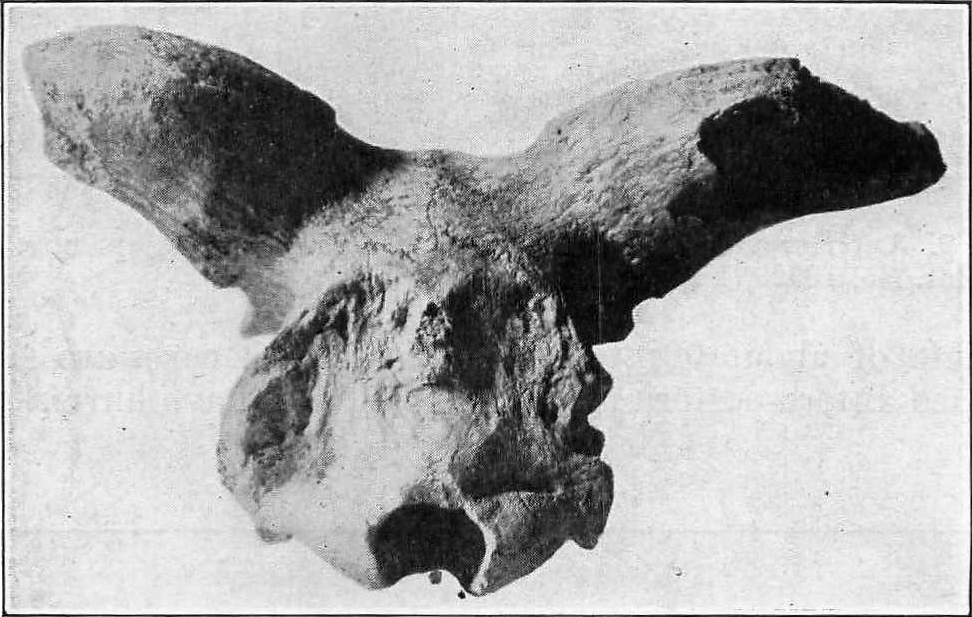
- Soergelia mayfieldi. Holotype.

Scientific classification
- Kingdom: Animalia
- Phylum: Chordata
- Class: Mammalia
- Infraclass: Placentalia
- Order: Artiodactyla
- Family: Bovidae
- Subfamily: Caprinae
- Tribe: Ovibovini
- Genus: †Soergelia; Schaub, 1951

Type species
- †Soergelia elisabethae Schaub, 1951

= Soergelia =

Soergelia Temporal range: Pleistocene

Extinct genus of mammals

Soergelia is a genus of extinct ovibovine caprine that was common across Europe, North America and Asia in the Pleistocene epoch.

Species include:

- †Soergelia brigittae Kostopolous, 1997
- †Soergelia minor Moyà-Solà, 1987. Found in Italy.
- †Soergelia intermedia Crégut-Bonnoure & Dimitrijević, 2006. Found in Macedonia.
- †Soergelia elisabethae Schaub, 1951
- †Soergelia mayfieldi Troxell, 1915. Found in Texas.
- †Soergelia longdanensis Bai & Wang, 2025 Found in China.

== Palaeoecology ==
δ^{13}C, δ^{15}N, and δ^{18}O measurements from S. minor at the Early Pleistocene site of Venta Micena in southeastern Spain reveal it to have been a mixed feeder.
