= Catalonia International Prize =

Spanish international prize

The Catalonia International Prize (Catalan: Premi Internacional Catalunya) is a Spanish international prize, awarded every year since 1989 by the Generalitat de Catalunya. The award recognizes the work of people who have not only contributed to the development of culture, science or economics, but have also stood out for having completed their work with a high ethical and humanistic commitment.

Institutions and organizations from all over the world present candidates every year, usually exceeding 200 people. A large jury, composed of various personalities from different fields, and independent of the Generalitat, determine one award winner each year. The prize is only given to living people, and cannot be awarded posthumously. Four times (1995, 2004, 2008, and 2013) the award has been shared by two people.

The prize is presented at the beginning of March by the President of the Government of Catalonia and consists of a cash prize (in 2005 it was 80,000 euros) and a work of art.

== History ==
Year	Winner	Nationality	Activity
1989	Karl Popper	United Kingdom	philosopher
1990	Abdus Salam	Pakistan	physicist
1991	Jacques Cousteau	France	oceanographer
1992	Mstislav Rostropovich	Russia	cellist
1993	Luigi Luca Cavalli-Sforza	Italy	geneticist
1994	Edgar Morin	France	sociologist
1995	Václav Havel; Richard von Weizsäcker	Czech Republic; Germany	writer essayist and politician politician
1996	Yaşar Kemal	Turkey	novelist
1997	Amartya Sen	India	economist
1998	Jacques Delors	France	politician
1999	Doris Lessing	United Kingdom	writer
2000	Abdallah Laroui	Morocco	historian
2001	Andrea Riccardi	Italy	historian
2002	Harold Bloom	United States	essayist
2003	Nawal al-Sa'dawi	Egypt	writer and social activist
2004	Sari Nusseibeh; Amos Oz	Palestine; Israel	philosopher and writer
2005	Claude Lévi-Strauss	France	anthropologist
2006	Pere Casaldáliga	Spain	religion
2007	Edward Osborne Wilson	United States	entomologist, biologist and science communicator
2008	Cynthia Maung; Aung San Suu Kyi	Myanmar; Myanmar	medic activist
2009	Bill Viola	United States	video artist
2010	Jimmy Carter	United States	politician
2011	Haruki Murakami	Japan	writer
2012	Luiz Inácio Lula da Silva	Brazil	metallurgist, trade unionist and politician
2013	Malala Yousafzai; Gro Harlem Brundtland	Pakistan; Norway	Student, activist politician
2014	Desmond Tutu	South Africa	activist
2015	Jane Goodall	United Kingdom	primatologist
2016	Josep Baselga; Manel Esteller; Joan Massagué	Spain	oncologist
2019	Vinton Cerf	United States	computer scientist
2020	Ngũgĩ wa Thiong'o	Kenya	writer and activist
2021	Judith Butler	United States	gender studies philosopher
2022	Svetlana Alexievich	Belarus	writer
2023	Joseph Stiglitz	United States	economist
2024	Amin Maalouf	Lebanon; France	writer
2025	Yael Admi; Reem Alhajajra	Israel; Palestine	peace activists
