= Yael (name) =

- Gender: Female
- Language: Hebrew

Origin
- Meaning: ibex, mountain goat
- Region of origin: Near Eastern

Other names
- Alternative spelling: Iael, Iaël, Jael, Jaël, Yaël, Ιαήλ (Greek)

Yael (Hebrew: יָעֵל, pronounced [jaˈʔel]; also spelled Jael) is a given name of Hebrew origin. It is the name of biblical figure Jael, who saved the Israelites by killing Sisera, commander of the Canaanite king Jabin's army, by hammering a tent peg through his temple while asleep in her tent. The Hebrew ya'el means ibex, a nimble, sure-footed mountain goat native to that region. As of 2018, Yael was one of the most common female first names in contemporary Israel.

== People with the given name ==
- Yael Abecassis (b. 1967), Israeli actress and model
- Yael Arad (b. 1967), Israeli Olympic-medalist judoka
- Yael Averbuch West (b. 1986), American soccer player
- Yael Bartana (b. 1970), Israeli video artist
- Yael Bitrán (b. 1965), Chilean-born naturalized Mexican historian, translator, and musicologist
- Yael Braudo-Bahat, Israeli peace activist
- Yael Cohen (b. 1986), founder and CEO of Fuck Cancer
- Yael Dayan (1939-2024), Israeli writer and politician
- Yael Eckstein, senior vice president of the International Fellowship of Christians and Jews
- Yael Falcón (b. 1988), Argentine FIFA football referee
- Yaël Farber (b. 1971), South African director and playwright.
- Yael S. Feldman (b. 1941), Israeli-born American scholar
- Yael German (b. 1947), Israeli politician
- Yael Globerman (b. 1954), Israeli poet, writer, and translator
- Yael Aloni Goldblatt (born 2008), Israeli rhythmic gymnast
- Yael Goldman (b. 1978), Israeli actress, TV host, and model
- Yael Grobglas (b. 1984), Israeli actress
- Yaël Hassan (b. 1952), French-Israeli writer
- Yael Tauman Kalai, Israeli-American cryptographer
- Yael Kanarek (b. 1967), Israeli-American artist
- Yaelle Kayam, Israeli Israeli filmmaker and journalist, whose first name is actually יעל
- Yael Kraus (b. 1977), Israeli singer/songwriter
- Yael Lempert (b. 1973/4), American diplomat
- Yael Goldstein Love (b. 1978), American novelist, editor, and book critic
- Yael Markovich (b. 1984), Israeli-American model and Israeli beauty queen titleholder
- Yael Meyer (b. 1981), Chilean singer, songwriter, musician, and producer
- Yael Naim (b. 1978), French-Israeli singer/songwriter
- Yaël Braun-Pivet (b. 1970), French lawyer and politician
- Yael Poliakov (born 1977), Israeli actress, comedian, and screenwriter
- Yael Rom née Finkelstein (1932–2006), one of the first female pilots of the Israeli Air Force
- Jael Ruesch (née Ashton), known as Jael (1937–2000), American fantasy artist/illustrator
- Yael Shelbia (b. 2001), Israeli model and actress
- Yael Stone (b. 1985), Australian actress
- Jael Strauss (d. 2018), contestant on America's Next Top Model, season 8
- Yael Tal (b. 1983), Israeli actress
- Yael Tamir (b. 1954), Israeli academic and politician
- Yael van der Wouden (b. 1987), Dutch author
- Yael Yuzon (b. 1983), Filipino vocalist and guitarist
- Yael Bar Zohar (b. 1980), Israeli actress, model, and television host

=== Middle name ===
- Jenifer Bartoli (Jenifer Yaël Dadouche-Bartoli) (born 1982), French pop singer
- Daniela Yael Krukower (born 1975), Israeli-Argentinean judoka world champion

== Pseudonym ==
- Jaël (born 1979), stage name of Rahel Krebs, Swiss singer/songwriter

== Fictional characters ==
- Yael, a woman in ancient Israel who escapes the massacre at Masada, in Alice Hoffman's novel The Dovekeepers (2011)
- Yael Aronov, in John Sanford's novel Storm Front (2013)
- Yael "Yaeli" Ashkenazi, in the Netflix Original series When Heroes Fly
- Yael Baron, in the Netflix Original series Degrassi: Next Class
- Yael Hoffman, in the TV series Weeds
- Alice Jael Reasoner, also known as Jael, an assassin in Joanna Russ' novel The Female Man (1975)
- Yael from "Return to Me" by Lynn Austin

== See also ==
- Ivanka Trump (born 1981), took the Hebrew name Yael after converting to Judaism
