= Reem Al-Hajajreh =

Palestinian peace activist (born 1980s)

- ريم حجاجرة
- Education: Al-Quds Open University
- Occupation: Peace activist
- Known for: Founder of Women of the Sun
- Children: 4
- Honours: The DVF Awards (2024); Time Woman of the Year (2024)

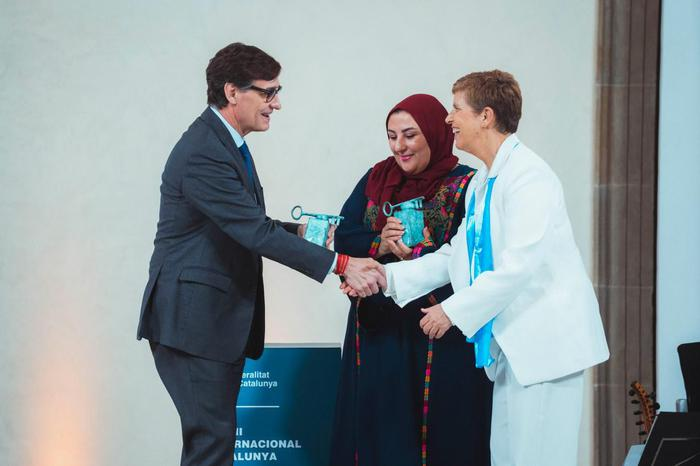
Salvador Illa presents the International Catalonia Prize to Reem Alhajajra and Yael Admi.

Reem al-Hajajreh (Arabic: ريم حجاجرة; born 1981 or 1982), also called Reem Hajajreh, is a Palestinian peace activist and founder of the group Women of the Sun.

Al-Hajajreh was named as one of TIME's 2024 women of the year, and was a 2024 recipient of The DVF Awards.

== Life ==
Al-Hajajreh grew up in Dheisheh, Bethlehem, in the West Bank, where she continues to live with her four children. She attended Al-Quds Open University, where she studied business administration and social work. She was driven to become an activist out of fear for her children's safety, knowing that under the status quo they were more likely to be imprisoned, wounded, or killed. In 2021, she founded Women of the Sun, which seeks to politically empower Palestinian women and to encourage a nonviolent end to the Israel-Palestine conflict.

Al-Hajajreh traveled to Israel with Women Wage Peace on several occasions before the Gaza war to share her story and the work of Women of the Sun. In January 2024, al-Hajajreh and Yael Admi, of Women Wage Peace, spoke at the French Parliament, where they called on Israeli and Palestinian leaders to return to negotiations to end the Israel-Gaza war. In September 2024, she was a pannelist at the Bled Strategic Forum international conference in Bled, Slovenia, speaking during the session "Reconciliation: Learning from the Past to Build a More Just Future". The following month, she was interviewed by France 24 and she and Women Wage Peace member Rita Brudnik spoke at the Women Making Peace in the Middle East conference in Milan, hosted by Bicocca University.

In regards to her work during the ongoing Israel-Gaza war, Al-Hajajreh noted in October 2024, "it was hard to continue to work with Israelis as the death toll mounted in Gaza and the conflict expanded" but that she looked to her children as motivation to continue her peacemaking work. On peace and the on-going Israeli-Palestinian conflict, she said "If we ask and demand peace, that doesn't mean that we accept the current situation and what the Palestinians are enduring. Our most important demand is the freedom of the Palestinian people".
