= The DVF Awards =

Women award

The DVF Awards, supported by The Diller-von Furstenberg Family Foundation, are given annually to provide recipients with the exposure and resources necessary to extend their efforts on behalf of women all over the world. The DVF Awards were conceived by Diane von Furstenberg in 2010 with the goal of honoring women who have displayed leadership, strength, and courage in their commitment to their causes.

Every year, each Honoree receives a $100,000 grant from the Foundation to further their work. The inaugural DVF Awards were presented on March 13, 2010 at a ceremony hosted by Diane von Fürstenberg and Tina Brown at the United Nations on the closing night of The Women in the World Summit. Each year, two DVF Awards are given to women within The Vital Voices Global Partnership. In addition, the Inspiration Award is given to a woman who has demonstrated strength and courage in the face of adversity, and is using her experience and influence to effect positive change.

The People's Voice Award is also given annually to a woman chosen from a field of nominees selected by The DVF Awards Board of Advisors and voted on by the public at DVFAwards.com. The Lifetime Leadership Award honors an individual who has dedicated her life and body of work to instilling in other women the courage to fight, the power to survive and the leadership to inspire. Past recipients include U.S. Supreme Court Justice Ruth Bader Ginsburg, Gloria Steinem, Ingrid Betancourt, Hillary Clinton, Oprah Winfrey and Robin Roberts.

Presenters at The DVF Awards have included Meryl Streep, Iman, Olivia Wilde, Jessica Alba, Deborah Winger, Gabby Douglas, and Chelsea Clinton.

== 2026 Honorees ==
The following are the honorees for 2026:

- The DVF Leadership Award: Lynsey Addario
- The DVF Leadership Award: Jane Fonda
- The DVF Leadership Award: The Honourable Mia Amor Mottley, S.C. MP
- The DVF Leadership Award: Wawira Njiru
- The DVF Leadership Award: Gisèle Pelicot

== 2025 Honorees ==
The following are the honorees for 2025:

- The DVF Leadership Award: Hanin Ahmed
- The DVF Leadership Award: Christy Turlington Burns
- The DVF Leadership Award: Fany Kuiru Castro
- The DVF Leadership Award: Kim Kardashian
- The DVF Leadership Award: Giulia Minoli

== 2024 Honorees ==
The following are the honorees for 2024:

- The DVF Leadership Award: The Right Honourable Dame Jacinda Ardern
- The DVF Leadership Award: Yael Admi
- The DVF Leadership Award: Reem Al-Hajajreh
- The DVF Leadership Award: Xiye Bastida
- The DVF Leadership Award: Alessandra Kustermann
- The DVF Leadership Award: Her Excellency Mrs. Graça Machel

== 2023 Honorees ==
The following are the honorees for 2023:

- The DVF Leadership Award: Amal Clooney
- The DVF Leadership Award: Amina J. Mohammed
- The DVF Leadership Award: Helena Gualinga
- The DVF Leadership Award: Dr. Joy Buolamwini
- The DVF Leadership Award: Lilly Singh

== 2022 Honorees ==
The following are the honorees for 2022:

- The International Award: Zoya Lytvyn
- The International Award: Hindou Oumarou Ibrahim
- The International Award: Women of Afghanistan
- The Inspiration Award: Ava DuVernay
- The Lifetime Leadership Award: Christine Lagarde

== 2021 Honorees ==
The following are the honorees for 2021:

- The International Award: Dr. Rouba Mhaissen
- The International Award: Wai Wai Nu
- The Inspiration Award: Clarissa Ward
- The Lifetime Leadership Award: Melinda French Gates
- The DVF Award: Vanessa Nakate

== 2020 Honorees ==
The following are the honorees for 2020:

- The International Award: Priti Patkar, Prerana
- The International Award: Saskia Nino de Rivera, Reinserta
- The Inspiration Award: Iman
- The Lifetime Leadership Award: U.S. Supreme Court Justice Ruth Bader Ginsburg

== 2019 Honorees ==
The following are the honorees for 2019:

- The International Award: Nadia Murad, Nadia's Initiative
- The International Award: Hadeel Mustafa Anabtawi, The Alchemist Lab
- The People's Voice Award: Susan Burton, A New Way Of Life Reentry Project
- The Inspiration Award: Katy Perry
- The Lifetime Leadership Award: Anita F. Hill

== 2018 Honorees ==
The following are the honorees for 2018:

- The International Award: Jaha Dukureh, Safe Hands For Girls
- The International Award: Ariela Suster, Sequence Collection
- The People's Voice Award: Luma Mufleh, Fugees Family, Inc.
- The Inspiration Award: Misty Copeland
- The Lifetime Leadership Award: U.S. Supreme Court Justice Sonia Sotomayor

== 2017 Honorees ==
The following are the honorees for 2017:

- The International Award: Yoani Sánchez, 14ymedio
- The International Award: Baljeet Sandhu, Migrant & Refugee Children's Legal Unit (MiCLU)
- The People's Voice Award: Louise Dubé, iCivics
- The Inspiration Award: Karlie Kloss, Kode With Klossy
- The Lifetime Leadership Award: Dr. Jane Goodall, The Jane Goodall Institute (JGI)

== 2016 Honorees ==
The following are the honorees for 2016:

- The International Award: Maria Pacheco, Wakami
- The International Award: Agnes Igoye, Huts for Peace
- The People's Voice Award: Emily Greener, I AM THAT GIRL
- The Inspiration Award: Sarah Jones, Girls Educational and Mentoring Services', The Legal Aid Society and Sanctuary for Families
- The Lifetime Leadership Award: Dr. Martine Rothblatt, Los Angeles LGBT Center and The Astraea Lesbian Foundation for Justice

== 2015 Honorees ==
The following are the honorees for 2015:

- The International Award: Adimaimalaga Tafuna’i, Women In Business
- The International Award: Samar Minallah Khan, Ethnomedia
- The People's Voice Award: Becky Straw and Jody Landers, The Adventure Project
- The Inspiration Award: Gabby Giffords, Americans for Responsible Solutions
- The Lifetime Leadership Award: Melanne Verveer, The Georgetown Institute for Women, Peace and Security at Georgetown University

== 2014 Honorees ==
The following are the honorees for 2014:

- The DVF Award: Kah Walla, STRATEGIES!
- The DVF Award: Liron Peleg-Hadomi & Noha Khatieb
- The People's Voice Award: Veronika Scott, The Empowerment Plan
- The Inspiration Award: Alicia Keys, Keep a Child Alive
- The Lifetime Leadership Award: Gloria Steinem, Equality Now and Donor Direct Action

== 2013 Honorees ==
The following are the honorees for 2013:

- The DVF Award: Sunitha Krishnan, Prajwala
- The DVF Award: Andeisha Farid, Afghan Child Education and Caring Organization (AFCECO).
- The People's Voice Award: Tammy Tibbetts, She's the First
- The Inspiration Award: Natalia Vodianova, Naked Heart Foundation
- The Lifetime Leadership Award: Robin Roberts, Be the Match

== 2012 Honorees ==
The following are the honorees for 2012:

- The DVF Award: Panmela Castro, Rede Nami
- The DVF Award: Chouchou Namegabe, South Kivu's Association of Women Journalists
- The People's Voice Award: Layli Miller-Muro, Tahirih Justice Center
- The Inspiration Award: Jaycee Dugard, The JAYC Foundation
- The Lifetime Leadership Award: Oprah Winfrey, The Oprah Winfrey Leadership Academy Foundation

== 2011 Honorees ==
The following are the honorees for 2011:

- The DVF Award: Sohini Chakraborty, Kolkata Sanved
- The DVF Award: Kakenya Ntaiya, Kakenya Center for Excellence
- The People's Voice Award: Taryn Davis, The American Widow Project
- The Inspiration Award: Elizabeth Smart, Elizabeth Smart Foundation
- The Lifetime Leadership Award: Secretary of State Hillary Clinton

== 2010 Honorees ==
The following are the honorees for 2010:

- The DVF Award: Danielle Saint-Lot, Femmes en Démocratie
- The DVF Award: Sadiqa Basiri Saleem, The Oruj Learning Center
- The People's Voice Award: Katherine Chon, The Polaris Project
- The Lifetime Leadership Award: Ingrid Betancourt, The Ingrid Betancourt Foundation

== See also ==
- List of awards honoring women
