= Bahat =

Bahat is a surname. Notable people with the surname include:

- Dan Bahat (born 1938), Israeli archaeologist
- Roy Bahat (born 1977), American venture capitalist
- Yael Braudo-Bahat, Israeli peace activist
