= The Adventure Project =

Nonprofit organization

The Adventure Project (sometimes referred to as TAP) is a nonprofit organization that creates jobs in developing countries in an effort to end poverty. The organization was founded in 2010.

== History ==
Becky Straw and Jody Landers met in Liberia and founded TAP in 2010. Becky Straw had a degree in International Social Welfare from Columbia University and had worked for UNICEF and charity: water.

== Reception ==
The Adventure Project has been covered by a variety of media outlets, including Fast Company, the Huffington Post, and Upworthy.

In 2015, co-founders Landers and Straw received the Diane von Furstenberg People's Voice Award.
