= List of mammals of Israel =

This is a list of the mammal species recorded in Israel. There are 123 mammal species in Israel, of which two are extinct, three are critically endangered, four are endangered, eleven are vulnerable, and three are near threatened.

The following tags are used to highlight each species' conservation status as assessed by the International Union for Conservation of Nature:

EX	Extinct	No reasonable doubt that the last individual has died.
EW	Extinct in the wild	Known only to survive in captivity or as a naturalized populations well outside its previous range.
CR	Critically endangered	The species is in imminent risk of extinction in the wild.
EN	Endangered	The species is facing an extremely high risk of extinction in the wild.
VU	Vulnerable	The species is facing a high risk of extinction in the wild.
NT	Near threatened	The species does not meet any of the criteria that would categorise it as risking extinction but it is likely to do so in the future.
LC	Least concern	There are no current identifiable risks to the species.
DD	Data deficient	There is inadequate information to make an assessment of the risks to this species.

Some species were assessed using an earlier set of criteria. Species assessed using this system have the following instead of near threatened and least concern categories:

LR/cd	Lower risk/conservation dependent	Species which were the focus of conservation programmes and may have moved into a higher risk category if that programme was discontinued.
LR/nt	Lower risk/near threatened	Species which are close to being classified as vulnerable but are not the subject of conservation programmes.
LR/lc	Lower risk/least concern	Species for which there are no identifiable risks.

== Order: Hyracoidea (hyraxes) ==
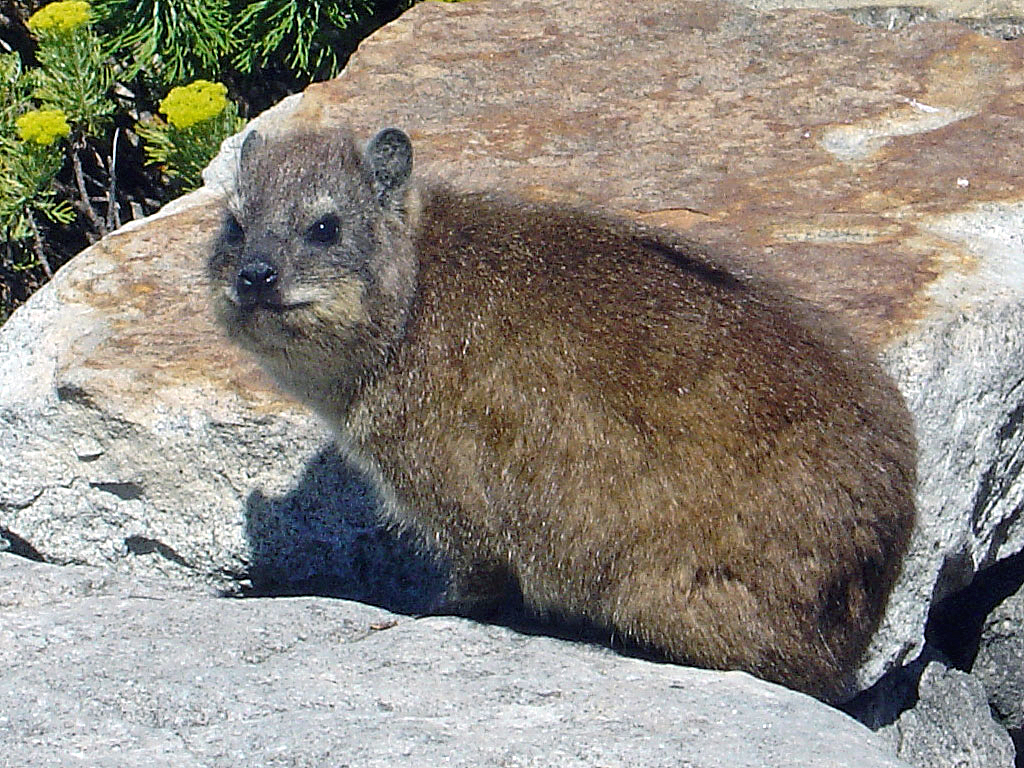
Cape hyrax

The hyraxes are any of four species of fairly small, thickset, herbivorous mammals in the order Hyracoidea. About the size of a domestic cat they are well-furred, with rounded bodies and a stumpy tail. They are native to Africa and the Middle East.

- Family: Procaviidae (hyraxes)
  - Genus: Procavia
    - Cape hyrax, P. capensis LC

== Order: Sirenia (manatees and dugongs) ==
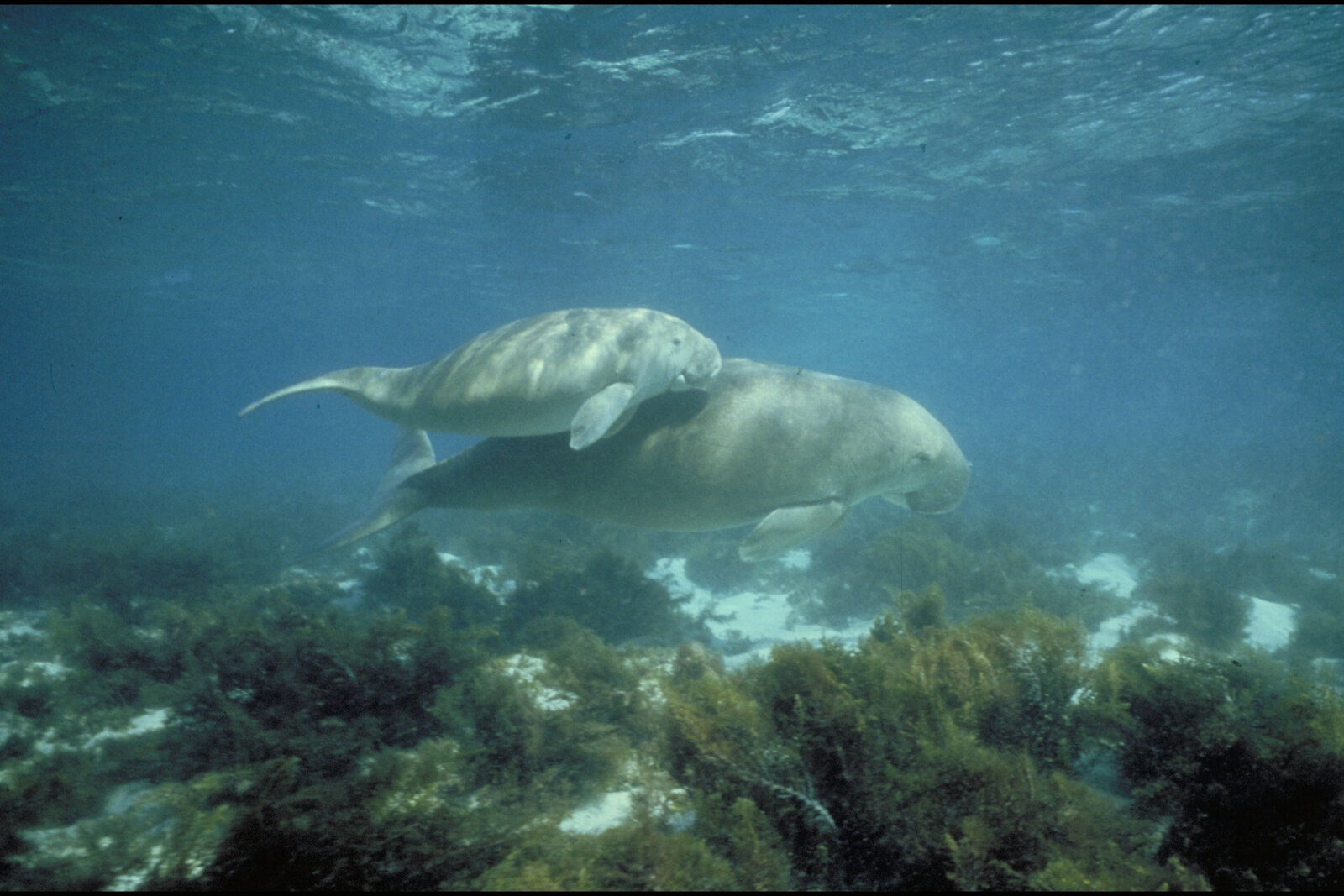
Dugongs

Sirenia is an order of fully aquatic, herbivorous mammals that inhabit rivers, estuaries, coastal marine waters, swamps, and marine wetlands. All four species are endangered.

- Family: Dugongidae
  - Genus: Dugong
    - Dugong, D. dugon VU

== Order: Rodentia (rodents) ==
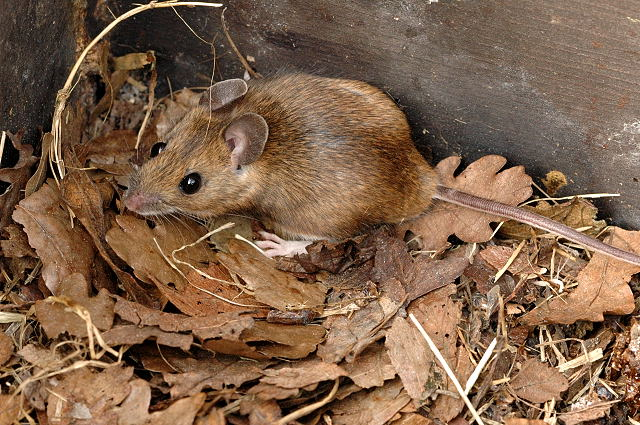
Yellow-necked mouse

Rodents make up the largest order of mammals, with over 40% of mammalian species. They have two incisors in the upper and lower jaw which grow continually and must be kept short by gnawing. Most rodents are small though the capybara can weigh up to 45 kg (99 lb).

- Suborder: Hystricomorpha
  - Family: Hystricidae (Old World porcupines)
    - Genus: Hystrix
      - Indian crested porcupine, H. indica LC
- Suborder: Sciurognathi
  - Family: Sciuridae (squirrels)
    - Subfamily: Sciurinae
      - Tribe: Sciurini
        - Genus: Sciurus
          - Caucasian squirrel, S. anomalus LC
  - Family: Gliridae (dormice)
    - Subfamily: Leithiinae
      - Genus: Dryomys
        - Forest dormouse, Dryomys nitedula LC
      - Genus: Eliomys
        - Asian garden dormouse, E. melanurus LC
  - Family: Dipodidae (jerboas)
    - Subfamily: Dipodinae
      - Genus: Jaculus
        - Greater Egyptian jerboa, J. orientalis LC
        - Lesser Egyptian jerboa, J. jaculus LC
        - African hammada jerboa, J. hirtipes NE
  - Family: Spalacidae
    - Subfamily: Spalacinae
      - Genus: Nannospalax
        - Middle East blind mole-rat, N. ehrenbergi LC
  - Family: Cricetidae
    - Subfamily: Cricetinae
      - Genus: Cricetulus
        - Grey dwarf hamster, Cricetulus migratorius LC
    - Subfamily: Arvicolinae
      - Genus: Arvicola
        - European water vole, Arvicola amphibius LC
      - Genus: Chionomys
        - European snow vole, Chionomys nivalis LC
      - Genus: Microtus
        - Günther's vole, Microtus guentheri LC
        - Persian vole, Microtus irani LC
  - Family: Muridae (mice, rats, voles, gerbils, hamsters, etc.)
    - Subfamily: Deomyinae
      - Genus: Acomys
        - Cairo spiny mouse, Acomys cahirinus LC
        - Golden spiny mouse, Acomys russatus LC
    - Subfamily: Gerbillinae
      - Genus: Gerbillus
        - Anderson's gerbil, Gerbillus andersoni LC
        - Wagner's gerbil, Gerbillus dasyurus LC
        - Lesser Egyptian gerbil, Gerbillus gerbillus LC
        - Pygmy gerbil, Gerbillus henleyi LC
        - Balochistan gerbil, Gerbillus nanus LC
      - Genus: Meriones
        - Sundevall's jird, Meriones crassus LC
        - Buxton's jird, Meriones sacramenti EN
        - Tristram's jird, Meriones tristrami LC
      - Genus: Psammomys
        - Sand rat, Psammomys obesus LC
      - Genus: Sekeetamys
        - Bushy-tailed jird, Sekeetamys calurus LC
    - Subfamily: Murinae
      - Genus: Apodemus
        - Persian field mouse, Apodemus arianus LC
        - Yellow-necked mouse, Apodemus flavicollis LC
        - Mt Hermon field mouse, Apodemus hermonensis EN
        - Broad-toothed field mouse, Apodemus mystacinus LC
      - Genus: Mus
        - Macedonian mouse, Mus macedonicus LC
      - Genus: Nesokia
        - Short-tailed bandicoot rat, Nesokia indica LC
      - Genus: Rattus
        - Brown rat, R. norvegicus LC introduced
    - Family: Echimyidae
      - Subfamily: Echimyinae
        - Tribe: Myocastorini
          - Genus: Myocastor
            - Nutria or coypu, M. coypus LC invasive

== Order: Lagomorpha (lagomorphs) ==
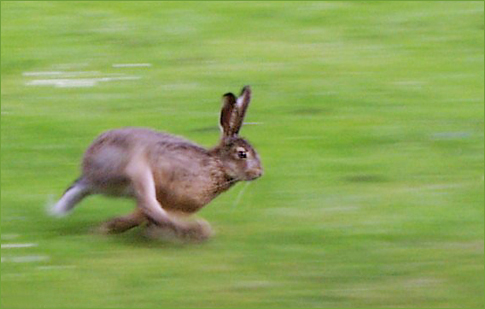
European hare

The lagomorphs comprise two families, Leporidae (hares and rabbits), and Ochotonidae (pikas). Though they can resemble rodents, and were classified as a superfamily in that order until the early 20th century, they have since been considered a separate order. They differ from rodents in a number of physical characteristics, such as having four incisors in the upper jaw rather than two.

- Family: Leporidae (rabbits, hares)
  - Genus: Lepus
    - Cape hare, L. capensis LC
    - European hare, L. europaeus LC

== Order: Erinaceomorpha (hedgehogs and gymnures) ==
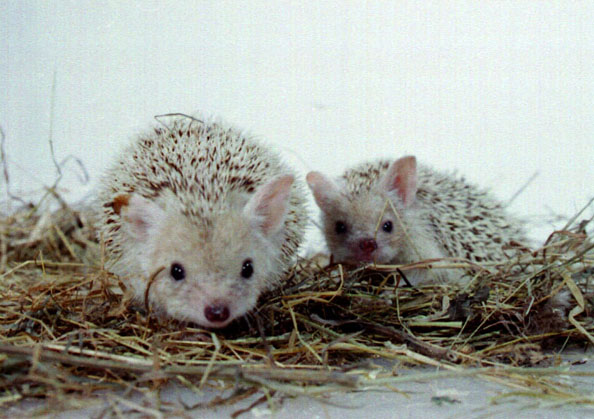
Long-eared hedgehog

The order Erinaceomorpha contains a single family, Erinaceidae, which comprise the hedgehogs and gymnures. The hedgehogs are easily recognised by their spines while gymnures look more like large rats.

- Family: Erinaceidae (hedgehogs)
  - Subfamily: Erinaceinae
    - Genus: Erinaceus
      - Southern white-breasted hedgehog, E. concolor LC
    - Genus: Hemiechinus
      - Long-eared hedgehog, H. auritus LC
    - Genus: Paraechinus
      - Desert hedgehog, P. aethiopicus LC

== Order: Soricomorpha (shrews, moles, and solenodons) ==
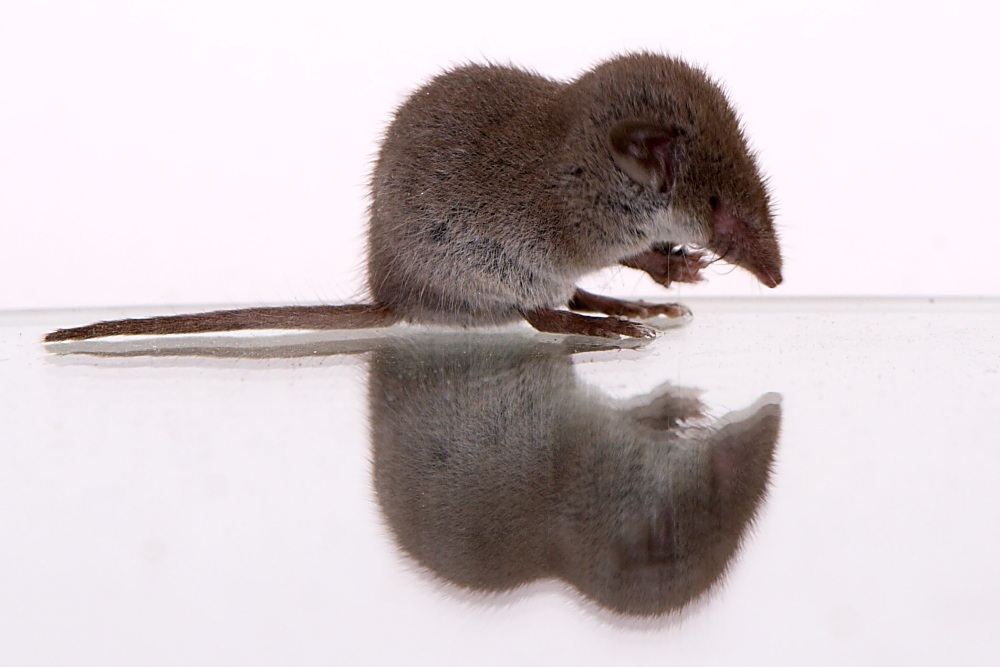
Lesser white-toothed shrew

The "shrew-forms" are insectivorous mammals. Shrews and solenodons closely resemble mice, while moles are stout-bodied burrowers.

- Family: Soricidae (shrews)
  - Subfamily: Crocidurinae
    - Genus: Crocidura
      - Bicolored shrew, C. leucodon LC
      - Lesser white-toothed shrew, C. suaveolens LC
    - Genus: Suncus
      - Etruscan shrew, S. etruscus LC

== Order: Chiroptera (bats) ==
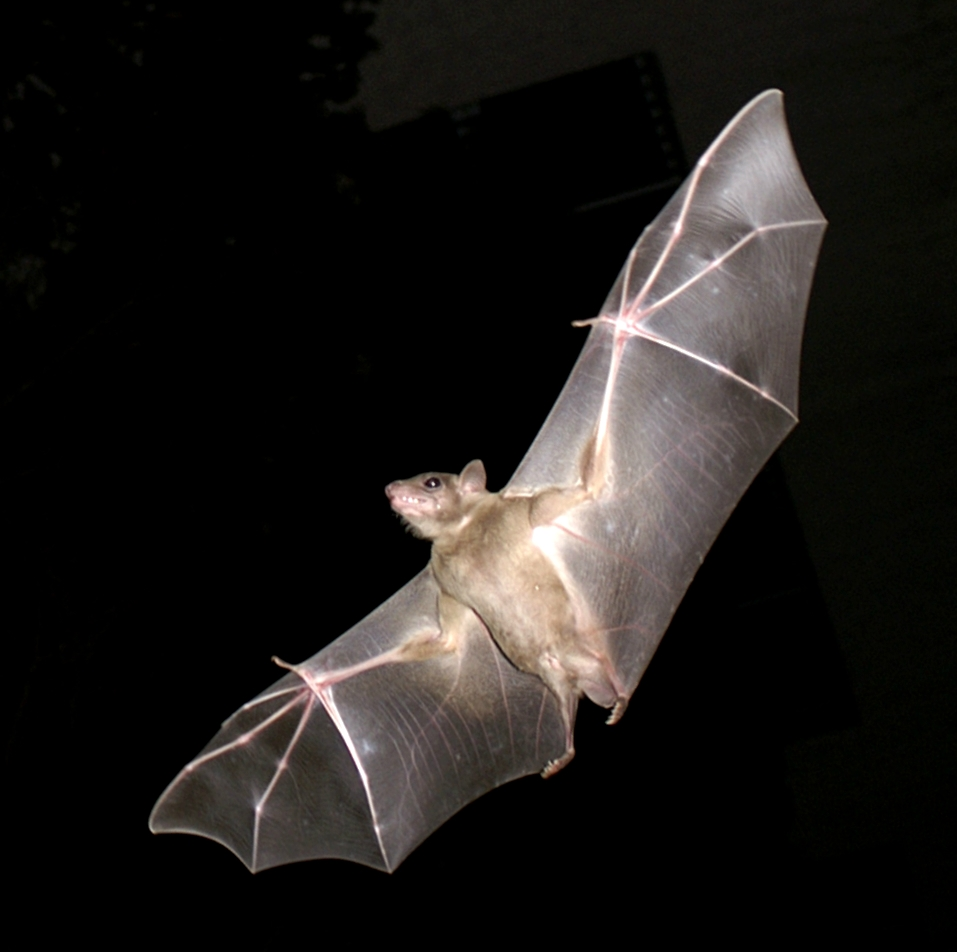
Common fruit bat

The bats' most distinguishing feature is that their forelimbs are developed as wings, making them the only mammals capable of flight. Bat species account for about 20% of all mammals.

- Family: Pteropodidae (flying foxes, Old World fruit bats)
  - Subfamily: Pteropodinae
    - Genus: Rousettus
      - Egyptian fruit bat, R. aegyptiacus LC
- Family: Vespertilionidae
  - Subfamily: Myotinae
    - Genus: Myotis
      - Lesser mouse-eared bat, M. blythii LC
      - Long-fingered bat, M. capaccinii VU
      - Geoffroy's bat, M. emarginatus LC
      - Greater mouse-eared bat, M. myotis LC
      - Natterer's bat, M. nattereri
  - Subfamily: Vespertilioninae
    - Genus: Eptesicus
      - Serotine bat, Eptesicus serotinus LR/lc
    - Genus: Hypsugo
      - Desert pipistrelle, Hypsugo ariel DD
      - Bodenheimer's pipistrelle, Hypsugo bodenheimeri LR/nt
      - Savi's pipistrelle, Hypsugo savii
    - Genus: Nyctalus
      - Common noctule, Nyctalus noctula
    - Genus: Pipistrellus
      - Kuhl's pipistrelle, Pipistrellus kuhlii LC
      - Common pipistrelle, Pipistrellus pipistrellus LC
      - Rüppell's pipistrelle, Pipistrellus rueppelli LC
    - Genus: Plecotus
      - Grey long-eared bat, Plecotus austriacus
  - Subfamily: Miniopterinae
    - Genus: Miniopterus
      - Common bent-wing bat, M. schreibersii VU
- Family: Rhinopomatidae
  - Genus: Rhinopoma
    - Egyptian mouse-tailed bat, R. cystops LC
    - Lesser mouse-tailed bat, Rhinopoma hardwickei LC
- Family: Molossidae
  - Genus: Tadarida
    - European free-tailed bat, Tadarida teniotis
- Family: Emballonuridae
  - Genus: Taphozous
    - Naked-rumped tomb bat, Taphozous nudiventris LC
    - Egyptian tomb bat, T. perforatus LC
- Family: Nycteridae
  - Genus: Nycteris
    - Egyptian slit-faced bat, Nycteris thebaica LC
- Family: Rhinolophidae
  - Subfamily: Rhinolophinae
    - Genus: Rhinolophus
      - Blasius's horseshoe bat, R. blasii LC
      - Geoffroy's horseshoe bat, Rhinolophus clivosus LC
      - Mediterranean horseshoe bat, Rhinolophus euryale VU
      - Greater horseshoe bat, Rhinolophus ferrumequinum LR/nt
      - Lesser horseshoe bat, Rhinolophus hipposideros LC
      - Mehely's horseshoe bat, Rhinolophus mehelyi VU
  - Subfamily: Hipposiderinae
    - Genus: Asellia
      - Trident leaf-nosed bat, Asellia tridens LC

== Order: Cetacea (whales) ==
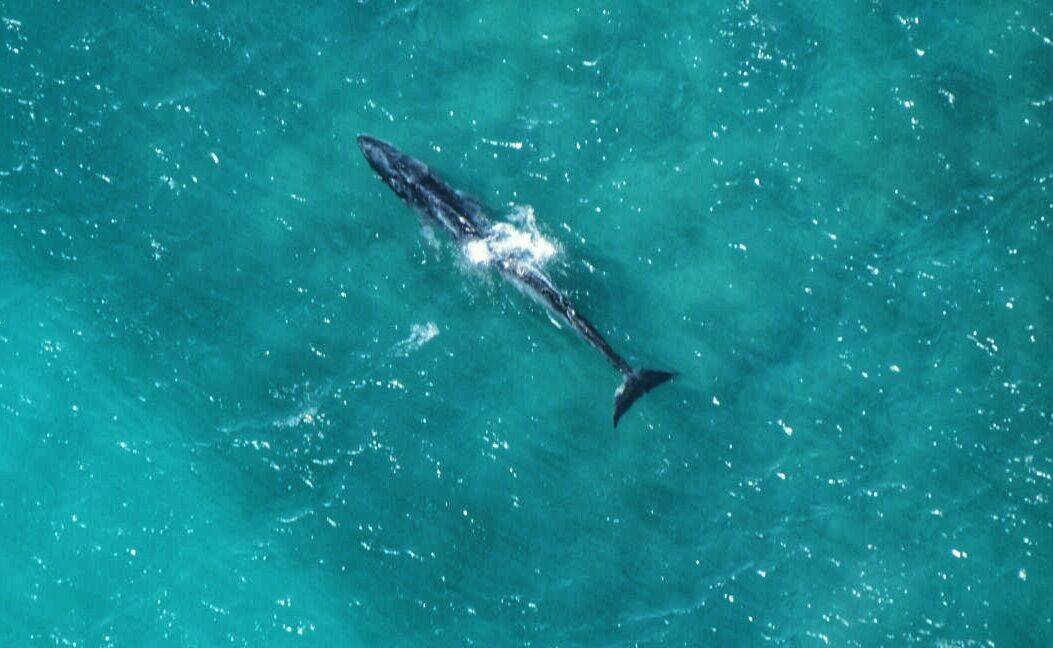
Fin whale in distress swims off national park of Caesarea Maritima

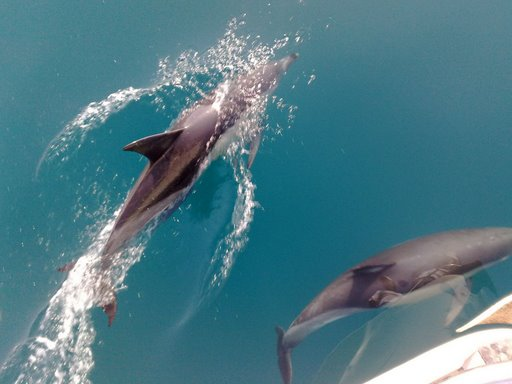
Short-beaked common dolphins bow-riding off Ashdod

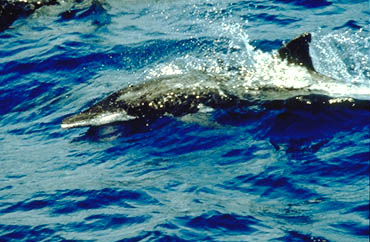
Rough-toothed dolphin

The order Cetacea includes whales, dolphins and porpoises. They are the mammals most fully adapted to aquatic life with a spindle-shaped nearly hairless body, protected by a thick layer of blubber, and forelimbs and tail modified to provide propulsion underwater.

- Suborder: Mysticeti
  - Family: Balaenopteridae
    - Genus: Balaenoptera
      - Common minke whale, B. acutorostrata LC
      - Bryde's whale, B. edeni DD
      - Fin whale, B. physalus VU
- Subfamily: Megapterinae
  - Genus: Megaptera
    - Humpback whale, M. novaeangliae LC
- Suborder: Odontoceti
  - Family: Physeteridae
    - Genus: Physeter
      - Sperm whale, Physeter macrocephalus VU
  - Family: Ziphidae
    - Genus: Ziphius
      - Cuvier's beaked whale, Ziphius cavirostris LC
    - Genus: Mesoplodon
      - Gervais' beaked whale, Mesoplodon europaeus DD
  - Superfamily: Platanistoidea
    - Family: Delphinidae (marine dolphins)
      - Genus: Tursiops
        - Common bottlenose dolphin, Tursiops truncatus LC
      - Genus: Steno
        - Rough-toothed dolphin, Steno bredanensis DD (once being considered as vagrants, but later confirmed as residential)
      - Genus: Stenella
        - Striped dolphin, Stenella coeruleoalba DD
      - Genus: Sousa
        - Indo-Pacific humpbacked dolphin, Sousa chinensis DD
      - Genus: Delphinus
        - Short-beaked common dolphin, Delphinus delphis LC
      - Genus: Grampus
        - Risso's dolphin, Grampus griseus LC
      - Genus: Orcinus
        - Orca, Orcinus orca DD
      - Genus: Pseudorca
        - False killer whale, Pseudorca crassidens DD
      - Genus: Globicephala
        - Long-finned pilot whale, Globicephala melas DD

== Order: Carnivora (carnivorans) ==
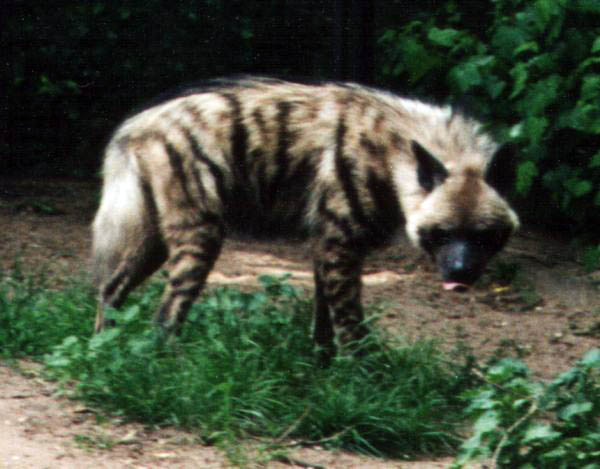
Striped hyena

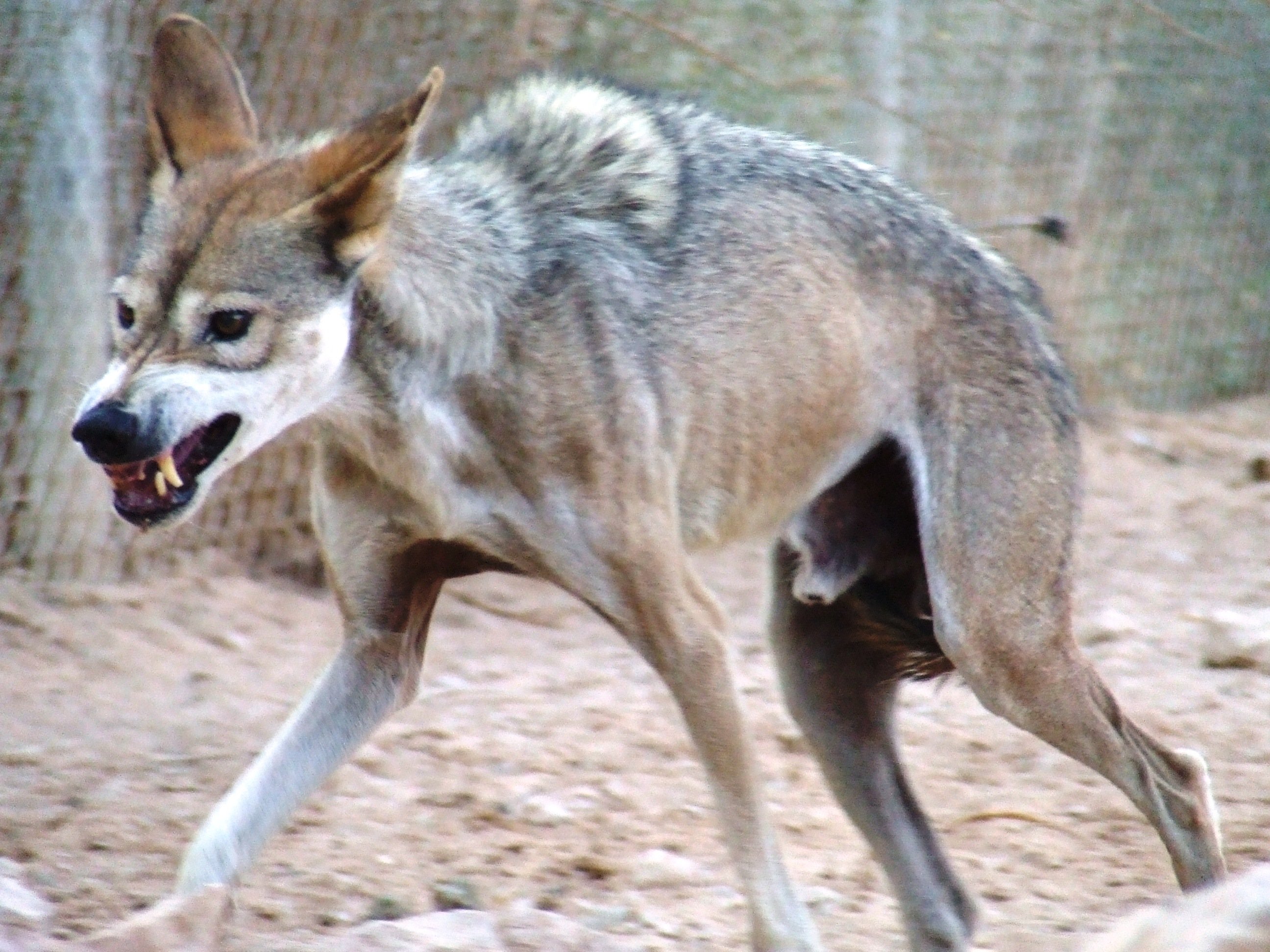
Arabian wolf

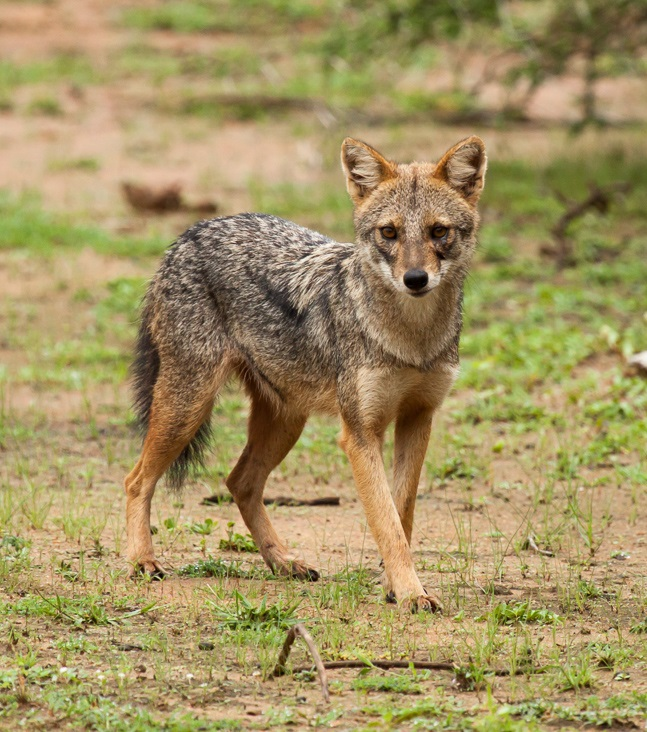
Golden jackal

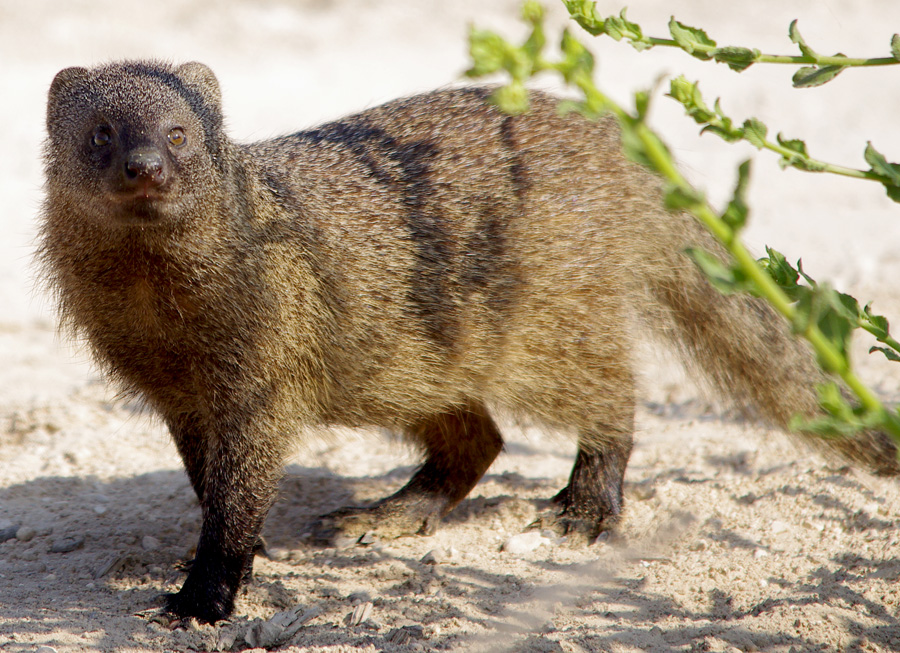
Egyptian mongoose

There are over 260 species of carnivorans, the majority of which feed primarily on meat. They have a characteristic skull shape and dentition.

- Suborder: Feliformia
  - Family: Felidae (cats)
    - Subfamily: Felinae
      - Genus: Caracal
        - Caracal, C. caracal LC
      - Genus: Felis
        - Jungle cat, F. chaus LC
        - African wildcat, F. lybica LC
  - Family: Herpestidae (mongooses)
    - Genus: Herpestes
      - Egyptian mongoose, H. ichneumon LC
  - Family: Hyaenidae (hyaenas)
    - Genus: Hyaena
      - Striped hyena, H. hyaena NT
- Suborder: Caniformia
  - Family: Canidae (dogs, foxes)
    - Genus: Canis
      - Golden jackal, C. aureus LC
        - Persian jackal, C. a. aureus
        - Syrian jackal, C. a. syriacus
      - Gray wolf, C. lupus LC
        - Arabian wolf, C. l. arabs EN
        - Indian wolf, C. l. pallipes VU
    - Genus: Vulpes
      - Blanford's fox, V. cana LC
      - Rüppell's fox, V. rueppellii LC
      - Red fox, V. vulpes LC
  - Family: Mustelidae (mustelids)
    - Genus: Lutra
      - Eurasian otter, L. lutra NT
    - Genus: Martes
      - Beech marten, M. foina LC
    - Genus: Meles
      - Caucasian badger, M. canescens NE
    - Genus: Mellivora
      - Honey badger, M. capensis LC
    - Genus: Vormela
      - Marbled polecat, V. peregusna VU

== Order: Perissodactyla (odd-toed ungulates) ==
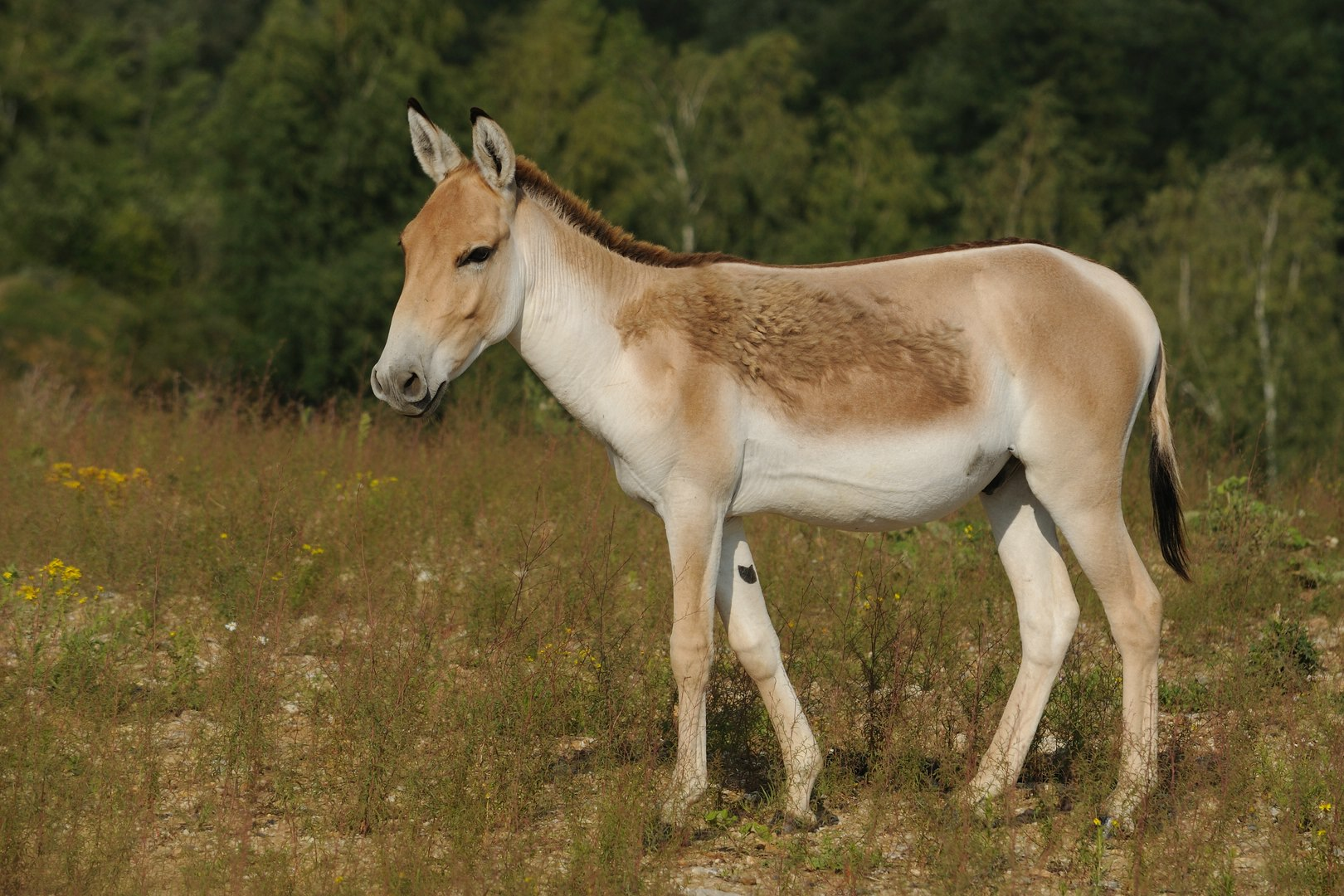
Turkmenian kulan

The odd-toed ungulates are browsing and grazing mammals. They are usually large to very large, and have relatively simple stomachs and a large middle toe.

- Family: Equidae (horses etc.)
  - Genus: Equus
    - African wild ass, E. africanus CR introduced on Yotvata Hai-Bar Nature Reserve
    - Onager, E. hemionus NT reintroduced
      - Turkmenian kulan, E. h. kulan EN reintroduced
      - Persian onager, E. h. onager CR introduced in Negev Mountains

== Order: Artiodactyla (even-toed ungulates) ==
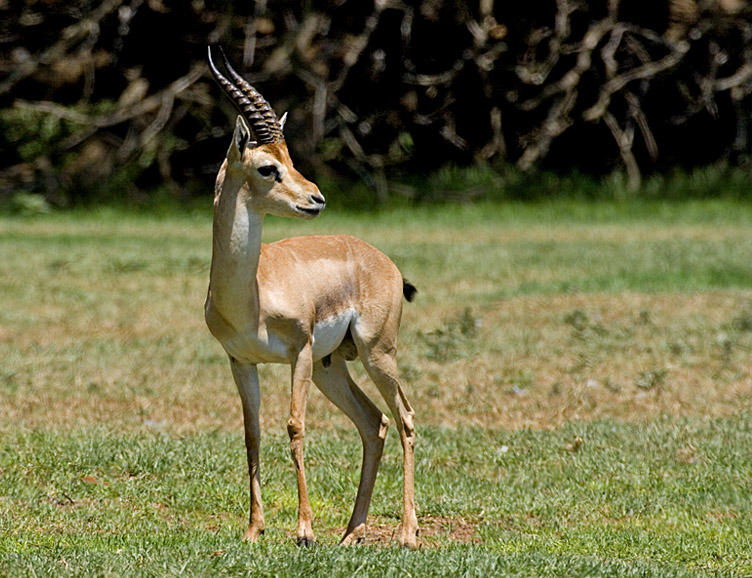
Mountain gazelle

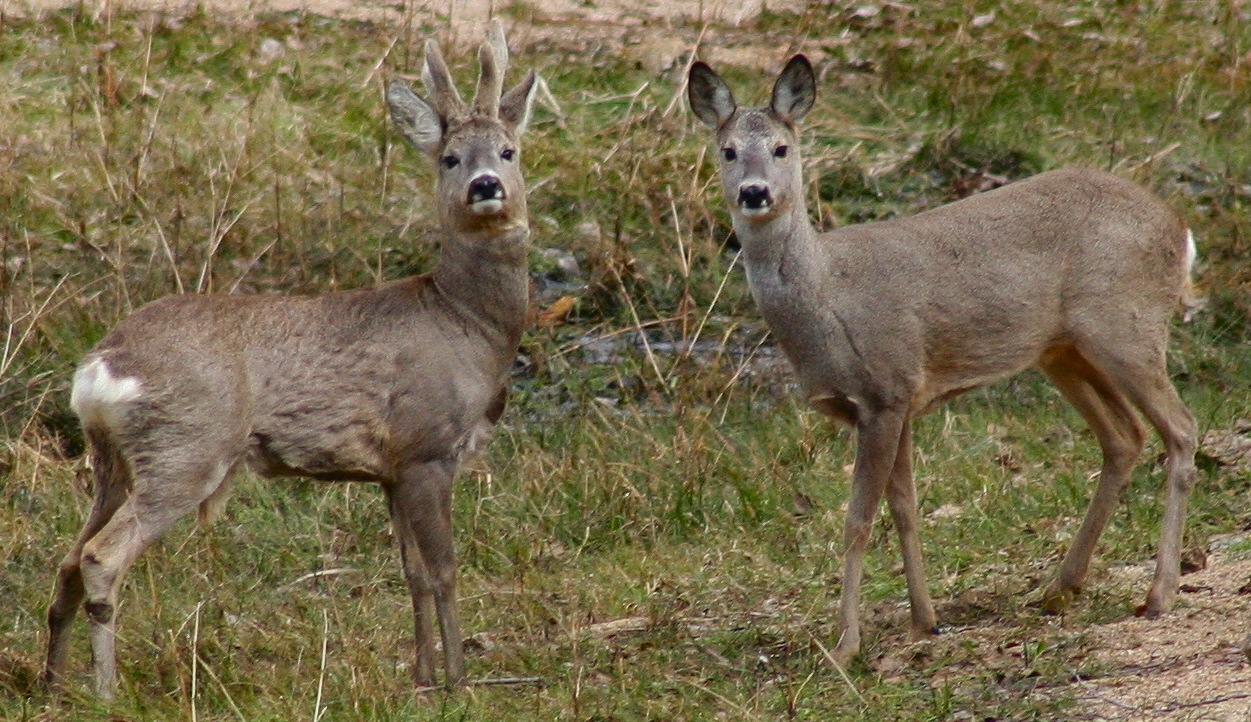
Roe deer

The even-toed ungulates are ungulates whose weight is borne about equally by the third and fourth toes, rather than mostly or entirely by the third as in perissodactyls. There are about 220 artiodactyl species, including many that are of great economic importance to humans.

- Family: Bovidae (cattle, antelope, sheep, goats)
  - Subfamily: Antilopinae
    - Genus: Gazella
      - Arabian gazelle, G. arabica VU
      - Dorcas gazelle, G. dorcas VU
      - Mountain gazelle, G. gazella EN
  - Subfamily: Caprinae
    - Genus: Capra
      - Nubian ibex, C. nubiana VU
  - Subfamily: Hippotraginae
    - Genus: Addax
      - Addax, A. nasomaculatus CR reintroduced on Yotvata Hai-Bar Nature Reserve
    - Genus: Oryx
      - Arabian oryx, O. leucoryx VU reintroduced
- Family: Cervidae (deer)
  - Subfamily: Cervinae
    - Genus: Dama
      - Persian fallow deer, D. mesopotamica EN reintroduced
    - Genus: Capreolus
      - Roe deer, C. capreolus LC reintroduced
- Family: Suidae (boars)
  - Genus: Sus
    - Wild boar, S. scrofa LC

== Globally and locally extinct ==
The following species are locally extinct in Israel, but continue to live elsewhere or in captivity:

- Asiatic cheetah, Acinonyx jubatus venaticus CR
- Red deer, Cervus elaphus LC
- Sand cat, Felis margarita LC
- Asiatic lion, Panthera leo leo EN
- Arabian leopard, Panthera pardus nimr CR (possibly locally extinct)
- Syrian brown bear, Ursus arctos syriacus EN
- Hartebeest, Alcelaphus buselaphus LC
- Hippopotamus, Hippopotamus amphibius VU
- Mediterranean monk seal, Monachus monachus VU
- Least weasel, Mustela nivalis LC
- Golden hamster, Mesocricetus auratus EN

The following subspecies are globally extinct:

- Syrian wild ass, Equus hemionus hemippus EX (1927)

== See also ==
- Wildlife of Israel
- List of chordate orders
- Lists of mammals by region
- Mammal classification
