= Yael Admi =

Israeli peace activist

- יעל אדמי
- Born: c. 1960

Academic background
- Education: Bar-Ilan University
- Thesis: (What is Man": Alfred Adler's Response to Immanuel Kant's Open Question) מהו האדם" המענה של אלפרד אדלר לשאלתו הפתוחה של עמנואל קאנט (2014)

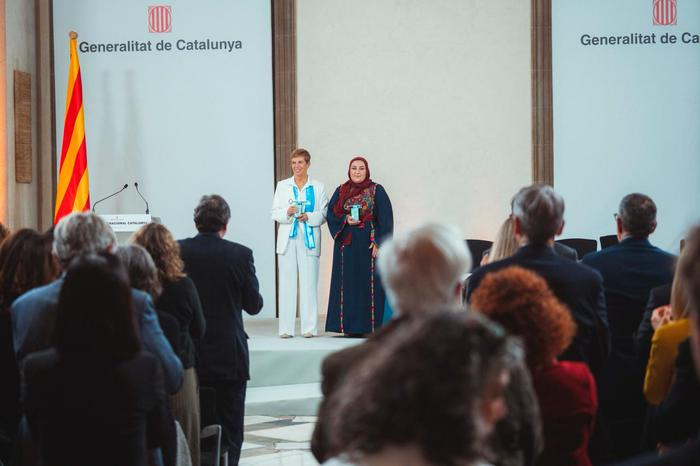

Yael Admi (Hebrew: יעל אדמי; born c. 1960) is an Israeli peace activist known for co-founding Women Wage Peace, an Israeli grassroots peace movement advocating peace in the Israel-Palestine conflict. In 2024 she was named a Time Woman of the Year.

== Early life and education ==
Admi was twelve years old when her brother, Yshai Ron, was killed in Egypt during the armed conflict between Israel and Egypt. Her mother died of sadness and despair after the loss of her brother. The death of her brother inspired Admi in her activism to devote all her time to making peace.

Admi received her Ph.D. in 2014 from Bar-Ilan University where she studied ethics and dialogue.

== Activism ==
Admi is known for her work advocating for peace and protection of women. She believes in the significance of breaking the cycle of revenge, as it brings nothing good to the world besides revenge. During the bloodshed, the women and children have always paid the highest price. Admi believes that women's voices, especially mothers', are crucial in changing the course of events. She believes that one should go beyond one's pain and achieve the highest level of solidarity and humanity, and refusing to sink into one's private suffering is the only way to end the war.

Admi has been a peace activist for 40 years. She was the Chairperson of the Israeli-Palestinian Bereaved Families Forum. She is a group facilitator specializing in conflict resolution with the Talking Peace organization and a group instructor and organizational consultant for the Adler Institute, where she has served on the Board of Directors since 2006.

Admi is a leader and co-founder, with Vivian Silver and others, of Women Wage Peace, an Israeli grassroots peace movement advocating peace in the Israel-Palestine conflict that was established after the Gaza War/Operation Protective Edge in 2014. Admi serves as a member of the strategic team of Women Wage Peace, arranging collaborations with other peace organizations, including a Palestinian women's organization, Women of the Sun.

In 2020, Women Wage Peace coordinated an event at Institute for National Security Studies to promote legislation drafted by Admi and Tami Yakira aimed at preventing additional wars. These conversations were continued in 2022 during a joint meeting of Women Wage Peace and Women of the Sun. These annual events are called "The Mother's Call". On October 4, 2023 women from both Women Wage Peace and Women of the Sun gathered at the Dead Sea, and talks were given by Admi, Reem Hajajreh, Stephanie Hallett, Sonya McGuinness, and others.

During the October 7 attacks in 2023, Vivian Silver was killed. The loss of a friend further motivated Admi's activism as she believes the tragedy is a chance for people to recognize the brutality of the war and make changes as a community.

== Awards and honors ==
In 2024 Admi, as a representative of Women Wage Peace, was named Time Magazine Women of the Year along with Reem Hajajreh, founder and director of Women of the Sun. The two organizations were nominated for the 2024 Nobel Peace Prize. In 2024 Admi was also honored by The DVF Awards in Venice.

== Personal life ==
Admi is married to Yoel Admi. She has six children and ten grandchildren.
