= Pravin Patkar =

Indian academic, social scientist, writer and human rights activist

- Patkar in 2015
- Born: Mumbai
- Education: Bombay University, Tata Institute of Social Sciences
- Title: Dr.

Pravin Patkar is an Indian academic and human rights activist. He co-founded Prerana, an NGO working for child protection & anti-human trafficking. In 1999, he founded Asia's first Anti-Human Trafficking Resource Centre supported by the US Government. He has served as an expert on several national and international agencies working in the anti-human trafficking sector. He has been in the teaching profession for over 40 years in both formal and non-formal education sectors. He has written books, published articles and created PSAs to prevent organized violence against women & children.

== Personal life ==
Pravin Patkar was born in Mumbai. He completed his PhD in Social Provisioning in Prostitution from Mumbai University. He is married to social activist Priti Patkar.

== Teaching ==
Pravin Patkar has been in the teaching profession for the past 40 years. He was part of the teaching faculty at TISS Mumbai for 20 years teaching social work and guiding research. He took voluntary retirement in 1995 as associate professor. He is currently adjunct teaching as a professor at Amrita Vishwa Vidyapeetham in Ettimadai, Coimbatore.

Patkar began a migrating education system and managed a residential school for children of tribes in bonded labor for 25 years.

== Activism ==
- He fought against tribal bondage and environmental destruction in the ecologically sensitive Western Ghats through a platform named Pariwartan-84. He closed down illegal activity and rehabilitated 70,000 families of seasonally migrant tribes.
- Under Prerana, he initiated comprehensive 24–7 field action to protect children born in red light districts from second generation trafficking into the sex trade.
- He made the first case to close brothels in India.
- He started Fight Trafficking a resource portal on anti-trafficking.
