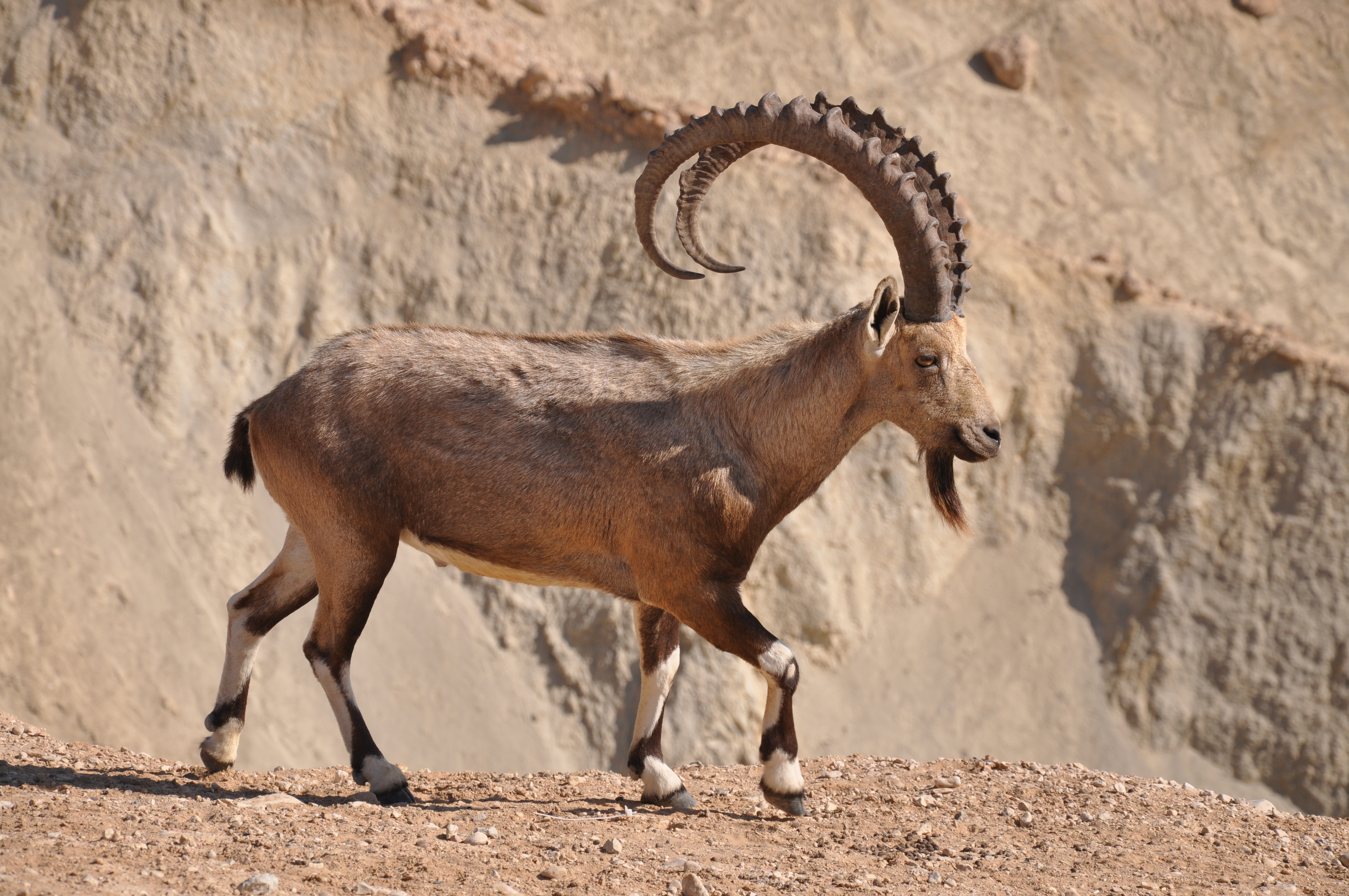
- Male
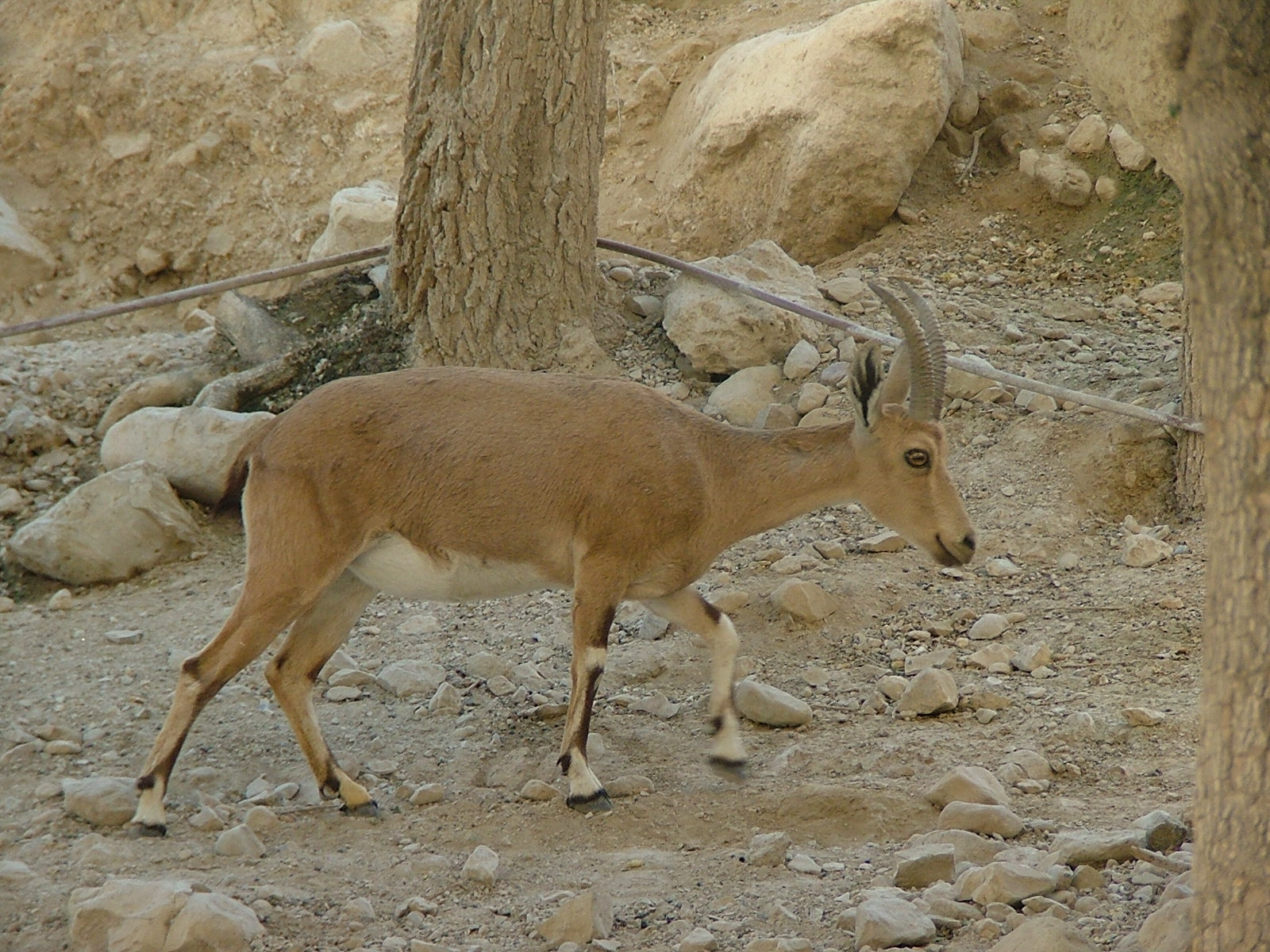
- Female

Conservation status
- Vulnerable (IUCN 3.1)

Scientific classification
- Kingdom: Animalia
- Phylum: Chordata
- Class: Mammalia
- Order: Artiodactyla
- Family: Bovidae
- Subfamily: Caprinae
- Genus: Capra
- Species: C. nubiana

Binomial name
- Capra nubiana F. Cuvier, 1825

= Nubian ibex =

Species of mammal

The Nubian ibex (Capra nubiana) is a desert-dwelling species of goat (genus Capra) found in mountainous areas of northern and northeast Africa, and the Middle East. Historically considered a subspecies of the Alpine ibex (C. ibex), it is now recognized as a distinct species. The wild population is estimated at 4,500 mature individuals, and it is classified as vulnerable by the International Union for Conservation of Nature.

== Taxonomy ==
=== Classification ===
The Nubian ibex was first identified in modern science by Frédéric Cuvier in his 1825 Histoire naturelle des mammifères: avec des figures originales, coloriées, dessinées d'aprèsdes animaux vivans, in which he illustrated the animal with the label "Bouc sauvage de la Haute-Égypte" ("Wild goat of Upper Egypt"). It was initially classified as Capra ibex nubiana, a subspecies of the Alpine ibex (C. ibex) identified by Carl Linnaeus in 1758. Other early researchers classified it as a now-defunct synonym, C. sinaitica, or the Sinai ibex. While it was referred to as its own species, C. nubiana, by some authors in the 19th and early 20th Century, the first widely recognized researcher to classify the Nubian ibex as a unique species, and not as a subspecies, was Hans-Peter Uerpmann in his 1987 book, The ancient distribution of ungulate mammals in the Middle East: fauna and archaeological sites in Southwest Asia and Northeast Africa. Capra nubiana, the Nubian ibex, is now broadly accepted by scientists as a unique species.

=== Fossil history ===
The earliest remains of the Nubian ibex in the Palestine region date back approximately 150,000 years to the Pleistocene, and it has been continually present in the region since then. In spite of the growing presence of livestock such as domesticated goats over the last 10,000 years, Nubian ibex have remained in the region throughout this time. However, its abundance has fluctuated in places like Ein Gedi, where it showed an increase in population in the late Holocene between approximately 5,165 and 950 years ago. Radiocarbon dated bones from archaeological excavations indicate that the Nubian ibex has been in a predator-prey relationship with the Arabian leopard throughout the Holocene.

=== Phylogeny ===
The Nubian ibex shares a genus, Capra, with all other ibex and goats. Phylogenetic reconstructions of the ibex/goat family tree have mixed results, with different studies reaching different conclusions. One Y-chromosomal DNA analysis suggests two clades (subgroups) within the genus; the first clade contains domestic goats (C. hircus), wild goats (C. aegagrus), and markhors (C. falconeri). The second clade contains all other ibex, including the Nubian ibex. In this analysis, the Nubian ibex is most closely related to the Siberian ibex (C. sibirica). However, when the same study analyzed mitochondrial DNA, it was suggested that all members of Capra are in one clade except for the Siberian ibex. The study's authors provide potential explanations for this discrepancy, including a possible ancient hybridization of the ancestors of the two Y-chromosome clades.

A separate mitochondrial study suggests that the Nubian ibex forms a separate, more ancient offshoot from most other ibex. An additional Y-chromosomal DNA and mitochondrial DNA study concludes that Nubian ibex are most closely related to Ethiopia's Walia ibex (C. walie), and they may have separated about 800,000 years ago. Another study used multidimensional scaling (MDS) to suggest that Nubian ibex are more closely related to Alpine ibex and European ibex than to all others.

The following cladogram of seven Capra species is based on 2022 mitochondrial evidence:

- Capra
  - Siberian ibex
  - - Nubian ibex
    - - Markhor
      - - - Domestic goat
          - Bezoar ibex
        - - Alpine ibex
          - Iberian ibex

Genetic analysis suggests that their population was relatively high during the last interglacial period, and decreased during the last ice age. The genetic makeup of Nubian ibex as a species has remained unchanged for at least 2,000 years. There is genetic evidence of ancient gene introgression between Nubian ibex and bezoar ibex, which, in turn, interbred with domestic goats and left genetic signatures.

== Description ==
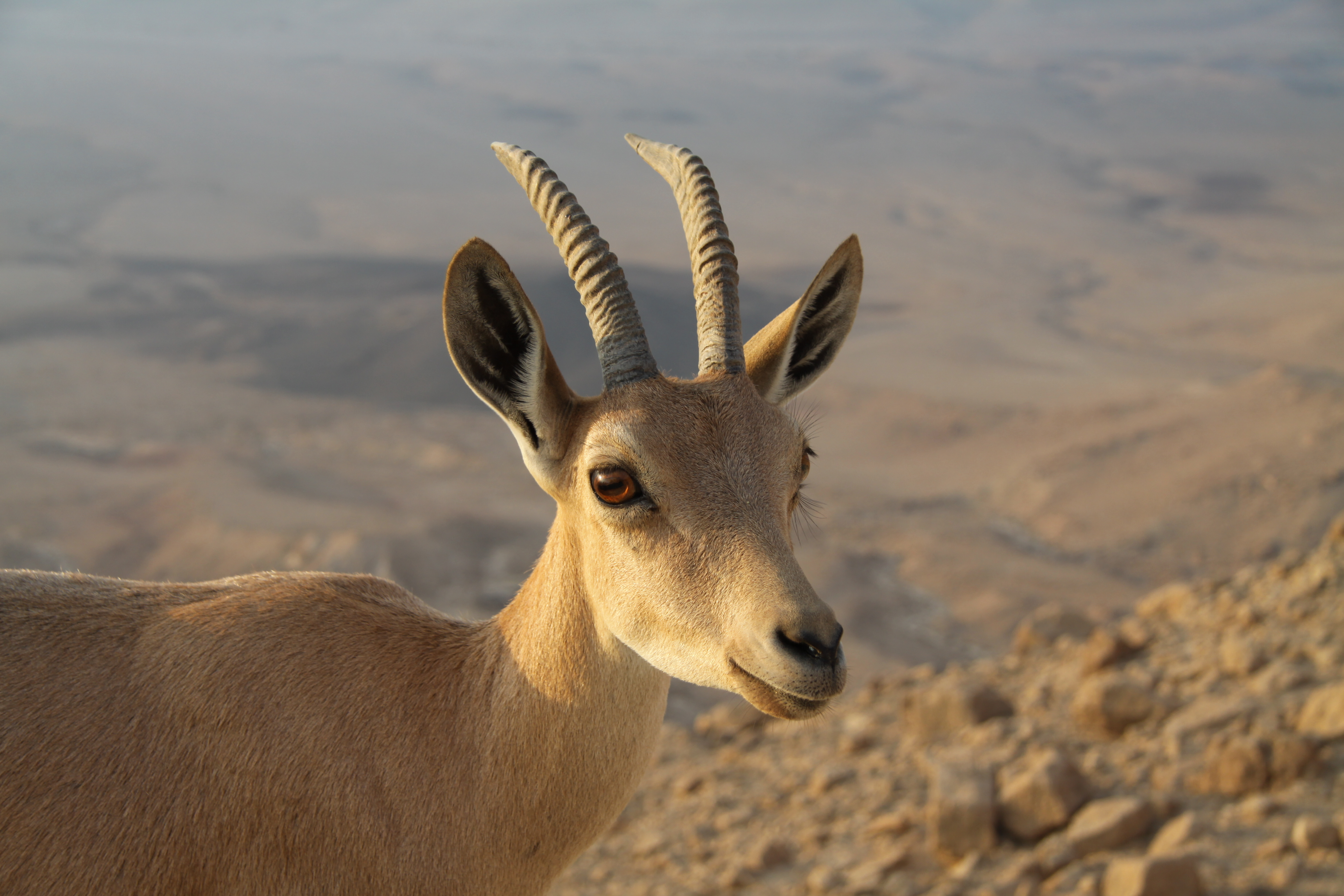
Nubian ibex near Mitzpe Ramon, Israel

Nubian ibex are the smallest ibex species, following Bergmann's rule. They stand around 65–75 cm (26–30 in) tall at the shoulder. They are sexually dimorphic: males are significantly larger than females, with males averaging 52–74.7 kg (115–165 lb) and females 25.3–32.7 kg (56–72 lb).

Weights of Nubian ibex by age classes
| Sex & Age | Number of individuals | Mean weight (kg) |
|---|---|---|
| Female (~4 years) | 22 | 32.7 |
| Male (2–3 years) | 5 | 37.8 |
| Male (4 years) | 3 | 53.7 |
| Male (~7 years) | 8 | 74.7 |

They are a light tan color, with a white underbelly; males also have a dark brown mane down their backs. Their legs have a black and white pattern. They have a lighter rump with a dark brown tail. Males begin growing a beard at age 2 or 3, which continues to grow longer and darker as they age. During the autumn breeding season, mature males grow a "rutting fur" on their breast and sides which is very dark brown. It appears in October in 3–4-year-old males, but it may appear as early as July or August in older males age 6 and up. However, not all males develop rutting fur, even at a mature age.

Nubian ibexes have long, thin horns that extend up and then backwards and down. In males, these reach around 1 m (3 ft 3 in) in length, while in females they are much smaller, reaching around 30 cm (12 in). Male horns are thicker than female horns, and grow large bulges which prevent the horns from sliding while the males are locked in combat. Male horn growth plateaus around age 7–8, where as female horn growth plateaus around age 4–6. There is a significant relationship between the individual's age and the number of horn ridges.

== Distribution ==
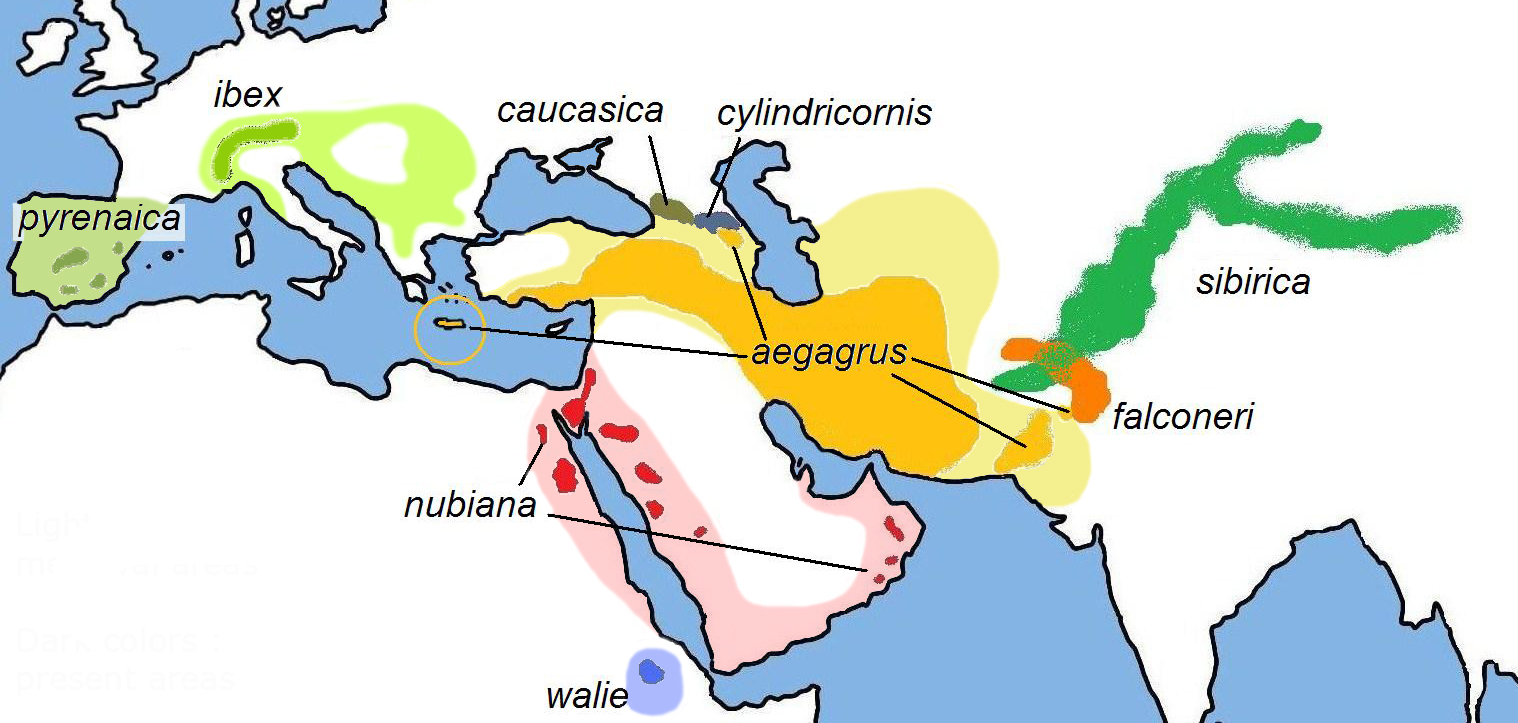
Ibex (Capra) distribution

Historically, Nubian ibex were distributed across the Middle East and Northeastern Africa. Its range today is within Egypt, Jordan, Oman, Israel, Palestine, Saudi Arabia and Sudan. It was extirpated in Lebanon, though a captive breeding and reintroduction process is underway. It has been extirpated in Syria. Its presence is uncertain in Ethiopia, Eritrea and Yemen.

== Ecology and behavior ==
=== Feeding ===
Nubian ibex live in rough, dry, mountainous terrain, where they eat mainly grasses and leaves, especially from Acacia trees (Genus Vachellia). They forage for food on the ground and may also rear up on their hind legs to reach leaves in trees. They can climb into trees while feeding. They reduce feeding on plants with strong defenses, such as tannins and thorns. Preferred plants vary depending on the amount of rain; rainy winters result in higher feeding preference for annual plants over perennials. Ibex preferentially feed in spaces that are close to cliffs where they can easily escape predators, demonstrating a Landscape of Fear: the farther from cliffs, the more vigilant ibex become. Ibex will also spend more time feeding in green patches with high nutritional quality and that are closer to water sources. Female Nubian ibex in Oman have been recorded consuming small bone fragments (osteophagy), a common behavior in mammals to supplement calcium and phosphorus in their diet.

=== Ecological relationships ===
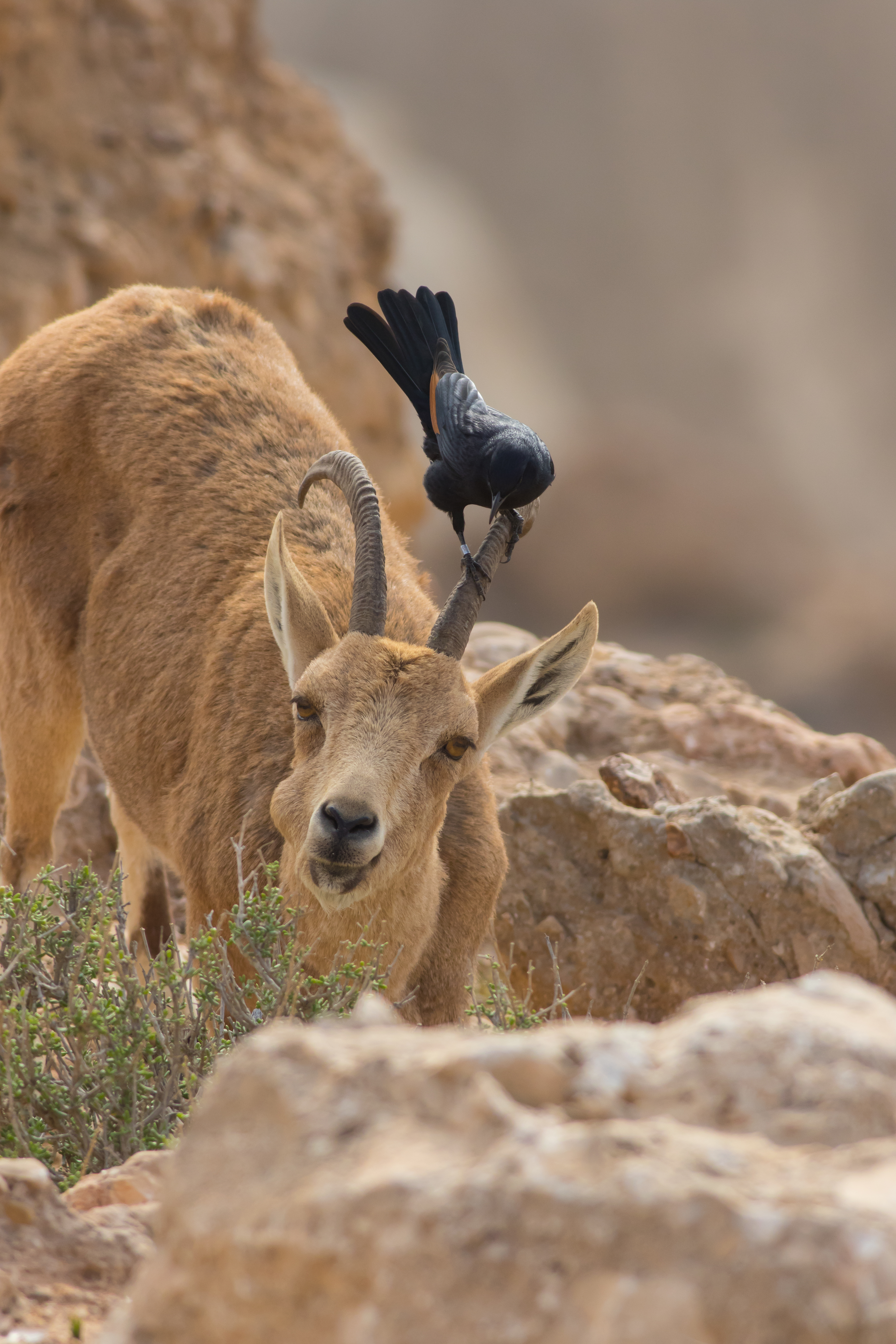
A Tristram's starling grooms a Nubian ibex in Israel

They are preyed upon by Arabian leopards (Panthera pardus nimr), Arabian wolves (Canis lupus arabs), golden jackals (Canis aureus), caracals (Caracal caracal), red foxes (Vulpes vulpes), golden eagles (Aquila chrysaetos), Eurasian eagle owls (Bubo bubo), and bearded vultures (Gypaetus barbatus). When alarmed, they emit a shrill call to alert other ibex of danger. They share their habitat with numerous other herbivores, including rock hyrax (Procavia capensis), Arabian oryx (Oryx leucoryx), gazelles (Genus gazella), and Asiatic wild ass (Equus hemionus). Nubian ibex have a mutualistic relationship with Tristram's starling (Onycognathus tristrumil), a small bird that eats the parasites on the ibex's skin.

They may host parasites including: the ibex fly (Lipoptena chalcomelanea), blood sucking lice (Linognathus africanus and Damalinia sp.), ticks (Hyalomma rhipicephaloides, Boophilus annulatus, and others), mites (Psoroptes cuniculi and Sarcoptes scabiei), biting flies (Oestrus sp.) and fleas. They have also been found with brain cysts caused by the parasite Taenia multiceps.

=== Disease ===
Nubian ibex have been detected with a strain of the malignant catarrhal fever (MCF) virus group of ruminant rhadinoviruses, closely related to caprine herpesvirus 2 (CpHV-2) found in domestic goats. Nubian ibex in Qatar's Al Wabra Wildlife Preservation have been infected by caprine pleuropneumonia. In Jerusalem's Biblical Zoo, the Nubian ibex herd suffered an outbreak of peste des petits ruminants. A trail camera study identified ibex infected with caseous lymphadenitis, infectious keratoconjunctivitis, contagious ecthyma, and infections from biting flies.

=== Social behavior ===
Ibex are social, and herds tend to consist of females, young, and males up to the age of about three years. Herds are typically up to 20 individuals, but are sometimes as high as 50. Groups can also be smaller (less than 10) in habitats with fewer resources. Female herds are often composed of related individuals that follow a dominance hierarchy. Female herds tend to remain around permanent water sources throughout the year, whereas males are more transient. The males are solitary or form more transitory bands of up to eight individuals. During the breeding season, males join the female-based herds for the six- to eight-week rut. Large males then do battle with much clashing of horns.

=== Movement ===
Nubian ibexes are diurnal, meaning they are active during the day, and rest at night. Like other ibex and goats, Nubian ibex spend much of their time on and around cliffs, which offer safety from potential predators. Ibex perceive a greater predation risk as they move farther away from cliffs. They climb and leap with ease, spanning several meters horizontally and vertically in a single jump. Ibex typically traverse cliffs in single file when possible, and keep relatively horizontal in their orientation. Their repeated movement over time creates well-worn hillside trails.

Ibex migrate throughout the day and throughout the year. During the day, they navigate between food patches as they forage. They may rest throughout the day to chew their cud, especially around midday. Additionally, on cold winter days, ibex in Egypt have been documented following the path of the sun each day to stay warm. At night, they sleep on cliff sides in small depressions that they dig. These shallow diggings create microhabitats where a diverse range of seedlings can germinate, adding to the habitat's diversity. In winter and early spring, the Middle East's rainy season, ibex often disperse to open plateaus where they can feed on new plant life. In the hot, dry summer, they congregate around shaded oases with water and greenery.

=== Reproduction and life history ===
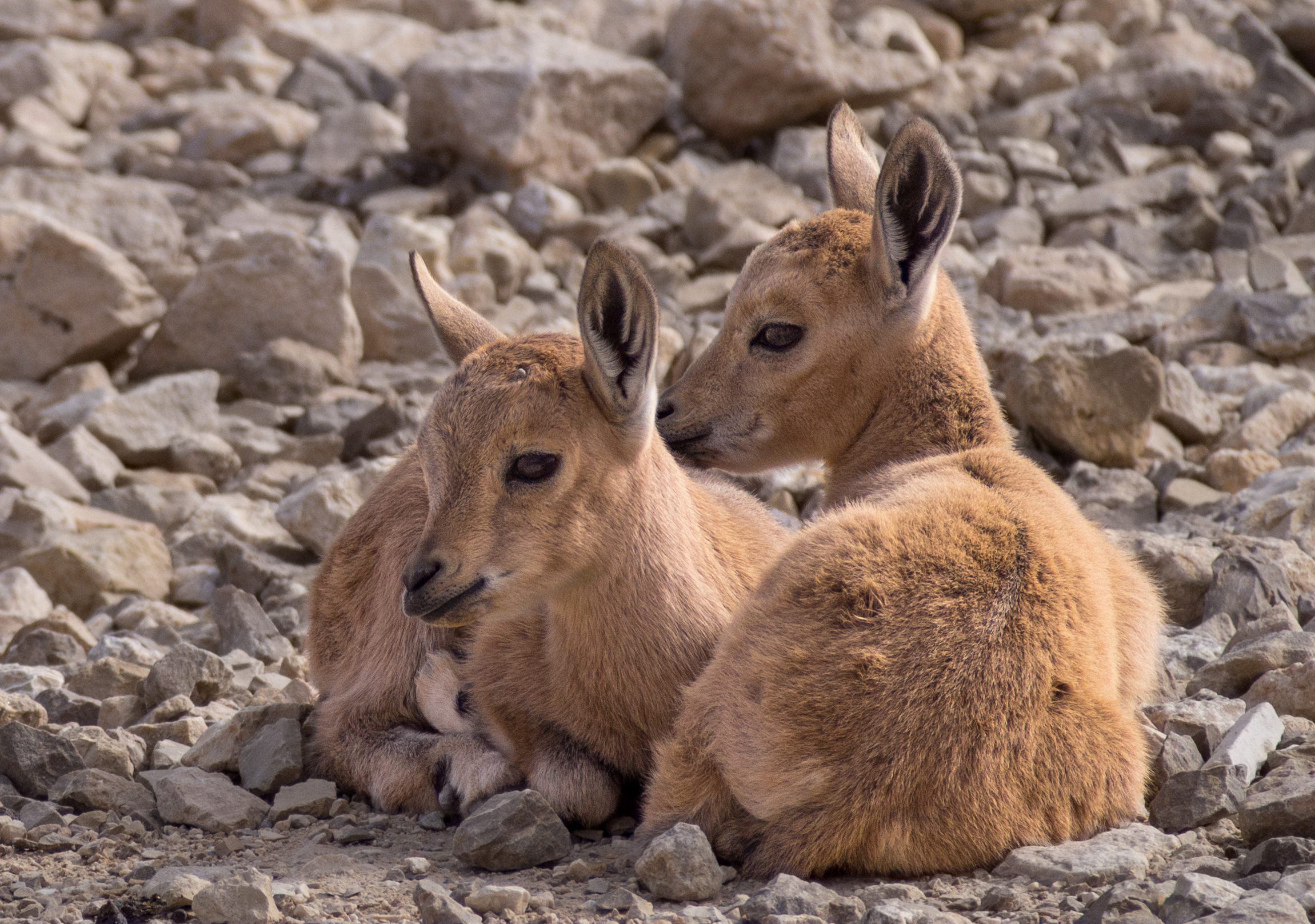
Two Nubian ibex kids

Mating season is typically in October and November, during which a dominant male will pursue several females. Males produce a strong scented secretion when females are in estrous. As they pursue potential mates, they curl their lips and smell the females' anal region. Males can reach breeding maturity as young as 2 years, but may not be allowed to mate until age 5 when they are strong enough to fend off rival males. Females can breed as young as six months old, but often don't breed until age 1–3. Studies suggest that some Nubian ibex subpopulations are developing a second mating season in the spring, in response to hyper-arid climates.

Gestation lasts 5 months. Litters of 1–2 kids are born between March and July, although the majority of births are synchronized in a 3–4 week period that peaks in late March and April. Females leave the herd to give birth in a secluded space. Newborns can stand within 15 minutes of birth, and can nurse within two hours. The mother and young rejoin the herd in a few days, joining other mothers and young to form a crèche for several weeks. Leaving kids in a sheltered crèche allows mothers to seek out richer food patches and spaces that are farther from cliffs, compared to mothers that keep their kids with them at all times. Kids are weaned around 4 months old. Females reach mature size at age 3–4, while males reach it around 6 years old. Nubian ibex can live up to 12 years in the wild and 18 years in captivity.

== Physiology ==
=== Eyes and vision ===
Nubian ibex vision is adapted to navigating visually on mountainous terrain. A study of their retinal ganglion cell density shows that they share many traits with other artiodactyls: a temporal area, horizontal streak, and dorsotemporal extension. They have a potentially unique dorsotemporal area of high ganglion cell density that benefits vision in the lower visual field, helpful for navigating varied terrain. Additionally, they have a more loosely organized horizontal streak than other hoofed animals. Their tapetum lucidum is morphologically similar to that of goats. It is blue-green, and enhances their night vision and vision of the horizon. The spatial resolving power in their temporal area is 17 cycles/degree, meaning that they can distinguish objects as small as 3 mm (0.12 in) from a distance of up to 30 metres (98 ft), allowing for food identification and predator detection. The Nubian ibex's standard intraocular pressure is estimated to be 17.95 ± 4.78 mmHg. They produce relatively low rates of tears compared to other animal species, leaving them highly susceptible to infection.

=== Blood composition ===
Nubian ibex can balance their body's nitrogen levels on poor quality diets by reabsorbing large quantities of their bodies' urea. This slows their metabolism when only poor quality food is available, but Nubian ibex can regain lost body mass rapidly upon returning to a higher quality diet. Nubian ibex and other desert-dwelling ungulates have elevated isotopes of nitrogen (δ^{15}N) due to their diet of plants that grow in denitrified soils.

Most hematological, serum biochemical, and electrolyte values are consistent between males and females. However, females have significantly higher red blood cell counts, hematocrit, total leucocyte (white blood cell) counts, and total serum bilirubin than males.

=== Genetic adaptations to the desert ===
Genetic analyses identify 22 positively selected genes in Nubian ibex, when compared to domestic goats (Capra hircus). The genes affect such functions as immune response, protein ubiquitination, olfactory transduction, and visual development. 3 of the genes have evolved to develop skin barriers that mitigate solar radiation in the hot desert. They have copy number variations (CNVs) of genes associated with xenobiotic metabolism and energy metabolism, due to processing desert plants with many secondary metabolites. Additional solar radiation mitigation adaptations include genes associated with hair follicle development and increased DNA repair mechanisms. Nubian ibex also have CNVs for expanded toxic compound removal, to deal with more toxic foods than other goat species eat.

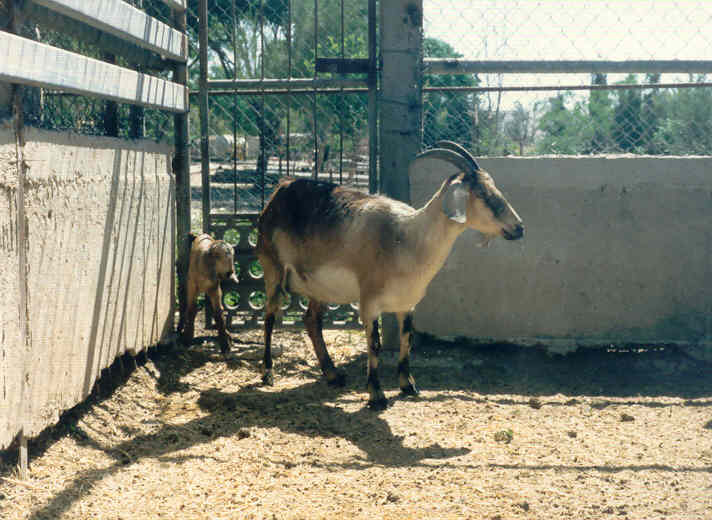
Yaez, a hybrid of Nubian ibex and domestic goat

=== Yaez (Nubian ibex x domestic goat hybrid) physiology studies ===
In the 1970s, researchers in Lahav, Israel, began breeding and studying hybrids of Nubian ibex and domestic goats, called "Yaez" ("יעז"). In one study of these hybrids, plasma testosterone peaked in August and testis size peaked in September–October. In a study on reproduction, researchers found that females were more likely to abort their young if they were first-time pregnancies and triplets (as opposed to smaller litters). Mortality rates of young were highest in spring and lowest in winter. Kid mortality rates increased with a higher proportion of ibex genes. When researchers compared the growth rate of male goat and Yaez kids, they found that young goats experience a higher growth rate in spring while Yaez kids grow faster in summer. Yaez kids were found to be more susceptible to disease and put on less weight when compared to their purebred parents.

== Human impacts and conservation status ==
=== Human impacts ===
The International Union for Conservation of Nature (IUCN) has classified the Nubian ibex as "vulnerable" on the basis that fewer than 10,000 mature individuals remain and the population is declining. Threats faced by the animal include competition with livestock for water and fodder, hunting pressure, climate change, habitat fragmentation, chemical pollution, and habitat destruction.

Ecotourism and outdoor recreation may disturb ibex in nature reserves, causing them to change their behavior in order to avoid people. When possible, they seek out water sources with lower human presence, and more readily abandon high quality food patches when human disturbance is high. Human presence in nature reserves may also contribute to decreased reproductive rates in ibex; when tourists stopped visiting Israel's Ein Avdat National Park during COVID-19 lockdowns in 2020, the ratio of young to female ibex more than doubled.

Conversely, some ibex have become habituated to human settlements and popular nature reserves, leading to potential conflict. Habituation is demonstrated by decreased vigilance in areas with greater human presence. These populations seek out towns due to abundant food, shelter, and protection from predators. Their habituation leads to property damage, consumption of harmful substances like garbage, behavioral and reproductive isolation from other populations, and reduced anti-predator behavioral responses.

=== Conservation and population status by country ===
| Country | Population | Details |
|---|---|---|
| Egypt | 600–1,250 | Two main populations are present, one in the Eastern Desert to the east of the Nile River and one in the South Sinai, with strongholds in the Elba Protectorate, Wadi Gemal Protected Area, St. Katherine Protectorate, Taba Protected Area, and Abu Gallum Protected Area. The populations are declining due to poaching. |
| Eritrea | Population and presence unknown | Due to civil unrest, no recent population estimates have been documented. On 16 March 1959, the British established the Yob Wildlife Reserve in northern Eritrea specifically to protect significant populations of Nubian ibex in the area. |
| Ethiopia | Population and presence unknown | Due to civil unrest, no recent population estimates have been documented. |
| Israel and Palestine | 1,200–1,500 | The region's ibex were hunted to near extinction after the First World War. When the State of Israel was established, hunting was outlawed and nature reserves were created, which allowed the ibex population to rebound. In Israel and the West Bank, ibex populations are concentrated in the Negev Highlands, Eilat Mountains, and the Judaean Desert. Wildlife corridors between these population centers allow for gene flow. An additional small population was reintroduced to the Golan Heights. Israel's population is relatively stable and strongly protected. The Nature and Parks Authority conducts annual population surveys and rehabilitates injured wild ibex. They also investigate poaching incidents and strongly enforce anti-poaching measures. |
| Jordan | 480–600 | Once nearly extirpated in the country, Jordan has re-established their ibex population through captive breeding and reintroduction programs. Population strongholds exist within protected areas, including Dana Biosphere Reserve, Wadi Mujib Biosphere Reserve, and Wadi Rum World Heritage Area. Reports suggest that the population is growing within protected areas. Their main threat is hunting. |
| Lebanon | 19; reintroduction in progress | Nubian ibex have been extinct in Lebanon since the mid-19th Century. In 2017, a small herd was brought to Al Shouf Cedar Nature Reserve from Jordan to re-establish a breeding population. Now the herd is living semi-wild in an enclosure within the reserve, with plans to fully release them into the wild in the near future. |
| Oman | 700–1,350 | Oman's largest ibex population strongholds are in the Dhofar Mountains, the Al Wusta Wildlife Reserve, the Huqf Escarpment and Janabi Hills. The population is in decline due to poaching, habitat degradation, and human expansion. |
| Saudi Arabia | Present, no official population estimate | Small ibex populations are present in protected areas, including the Hawtat bani Tamim Ibex Reserve. The population of this reserve has declined by 75% since 2005 due to poaching. In 2022, Saudi Arabia began a reintroduction program in an effort to rescue the population. Trail camera photos from 2022 show that ibex are present in several nature reserves across the mountainous regions of western Saudi Arabia. |
| Sudan | Potentially a few hundred; no official population estimate | Prior to 2010, surveys suggested a small population in the Red Sea Hills and the areas around Port Sudan, where they have been recorded for many decades. Historically they were documented in the Erkawit and Sinkat Sanctuaries, as well as the Tokar Game Reserve. However, due to civil unrest, no recent population estimates have been documented. |
| Yemen | Likely present, no official population estimate | Ibex have occasionally been detected in the Hawf Protected Area. Due to civil unrest, no recent population estimates have been documented. |

=== Captive populations ===
| Continent | Details |
|---|---|
| Africa | Nubian ibex live in Egypt's Giza Zoo. |
| Asia | Nubian ibex live in zoos across Israel, the United Arab Emirates, Gaza, Singapore, and Oman. Oman's wild ibex population is genetically distinct from its captive population, suggesting that the captive animals descend from ancestors of a different region. |
| Europe | Zoos in Estonia, France, Germany, Poland, and Switzerland each have Nubian ibex. |
| North America | Nubian ibex live in many zoos and other captive facilities across the United States. They all descend from ibex that lived in Israel's Yotvata Hai-Bar Nature Reserve. |

== Cultural significance ==
=== Ancient Middle Eastern cultures ===
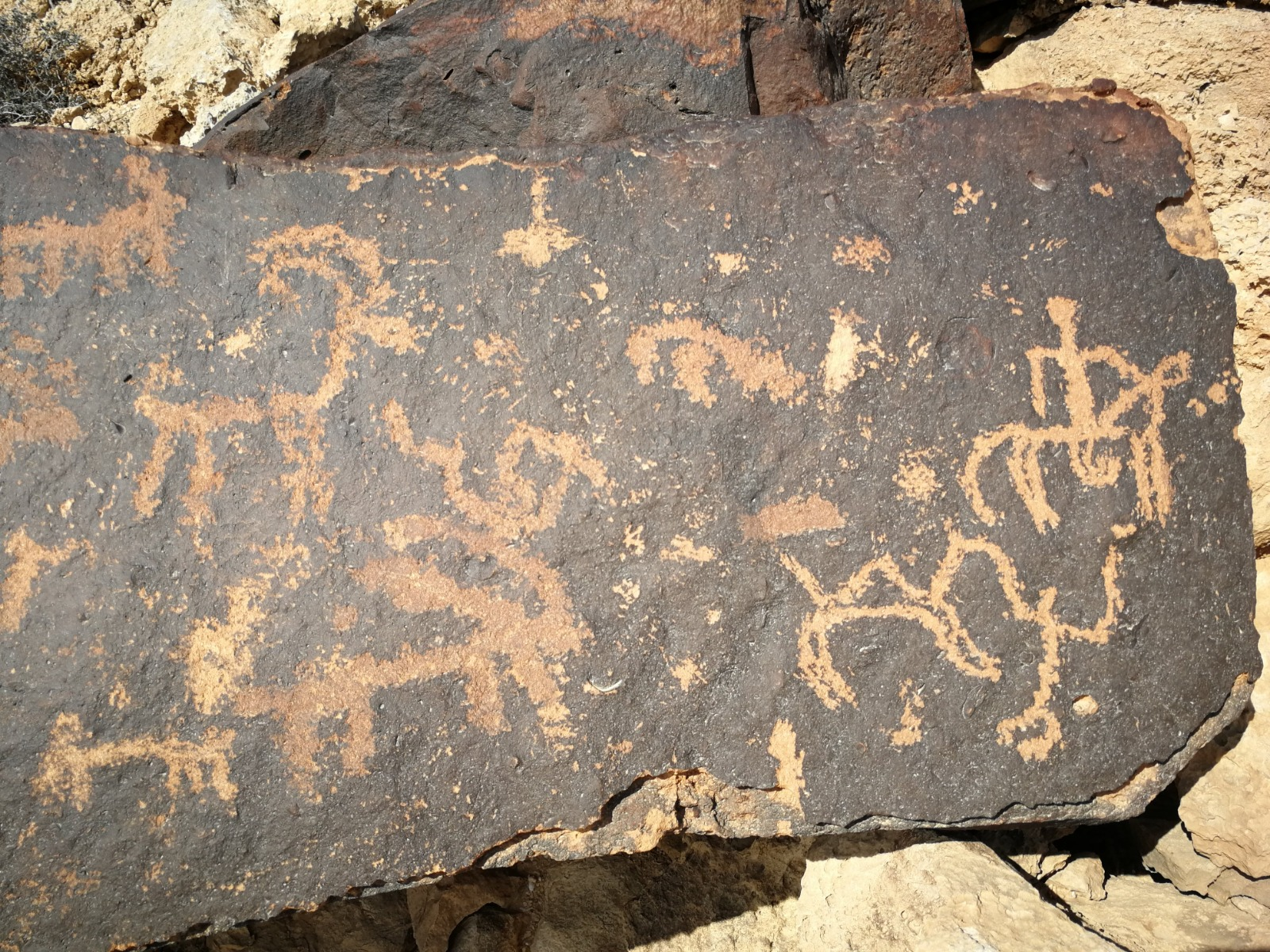
Ancient petroglyphs featuring Nubian ibex in Israel's Negev Desert

Nubian ibex played an important role in cultures of the ancient Near East. They have been a common image in petroglyphs (rock art), metal work, pottery, and other artwork across the Middle East for thousands of years, with some artwork dating back to the late Pleistocene. One example is a life-sized image carved in sandstone in Egypt, dated to the Upper Paleolithic. In petroglyphs, ibex are often portrayed as hunted by dogs and human archers. They are also frequently depicted alongside celestial imagery such as a star, sun, cross, or circle. They were commonly hunted using desert kites (long, narrowing walls that form an enclosure), dogs, stone enclosures, and nets.

The ibex's role in artwork has been suggested as representing literal acts like ritual hunts, as well as spiritual and metaphorical concepts such as resurrection, seasonal cycles of rain and drought, and the interplay of life and death. Ibex may have represented ancient Middle Eastern deities such as Dumuzi (Tamuz), Almaqah and Dushara. They are often identified with the constellation Capricorn in Mesopotamian and Iranian artwork from the 4th millennium BCE.

Medieval block printing of a young ibex from Egypt

A common motif in ancient Middle Eastern art contains a sacred tree, often the Tree of Life, flanked on each side by an ibex. This motif is present across the region, from Iran and Mesopotamia to Arabia and the Horn of Africa. Assyrian travelers brought bronze artwork bearing the motif as far as Olympia, Greece. This motif is exemplified by the cult stand from Ta'anakh from the 10th Century BCE, which also contains two ibex next to a sacred tree, and other nature-themed carvings. It is thought to depict the relationship of Yahweh/El (God) and Asherah, a Semitic, nature-oriented goddess whose essence was later integrated into Judaism.

=== Horn of Africa ===
While Nubian ibex once inhabited the high-altitude regions of Somalia—specifically the Golis and Ogo mountains—they are no longer found there today. Their extinction in the region was driven by a combination of natural and human factors, most notably the devastating rinderpest epidemic of the late 19th Century and intensive trophy hunting by British colonists. The ibex holds a long-standing place in Somali heritage, appearing in prehistoric rock art both as naturalistic depictions of local wildlife and as potent symbolic figures. While this symbolism became more solidified during the era of South Arabian influence, the ibex’s status as a sacred icon actually predates that period. To the ancient inhabitants of the region, the ibex was a revered symbol of resilience, nobility, and beauty.

=== Modern cultures ===
The Biblical heroine Jael's name means "Ibex" in Hebrew. The Tanakh (Hebrew Bible) contains several references to ibex, notably in Psalm 104, the Book of Job, and 1 Samuel. The spring of Ein Gedi, home to an ancient Jewish village near the Dead Sea and a population of ibex, translates to "Spring of the goat-kid". Ibex are one of the species whose horns can be used to construct a Shofar (Jewish religious musical horn). The ibex is a Kosher species, meaning that, when prepared properly, they can be eaten under religious law. Nubian ibex skin was sometimes used to make parchments in ancient Israel. Ibex imagery is present in ancient Jewish artwork such as the Huqoq Synagogue mosaic from the 5th Century CE. The ibex was one of many animals invoked in parables written by Medieval Jewish scholars, such as in Isaac ibn Sahula's Meshal ha-kadmoni ("Proverb of the Ancient"). Ibex feature as imagery in Jewish love poems, such as Isaac Uziel's "Where will you camp, O my ibex?", written in the early 17th Century. In the early 20th Century, Russian Jewish performer Ida Rubinstein was characterized as "the great ibex of the Jewish Ghetto". Yael (יָעֵל) remains a common name for Jews, and is one of the most popular female baby names in Israel. The Nubian ibex is the symbol of the Israel Nature and Parks Authority and was chosen due to its iconic representation of Israeli wildlife, as well as for the resemblance of its rounded horn to a Roman arch, representing local archaeological history.

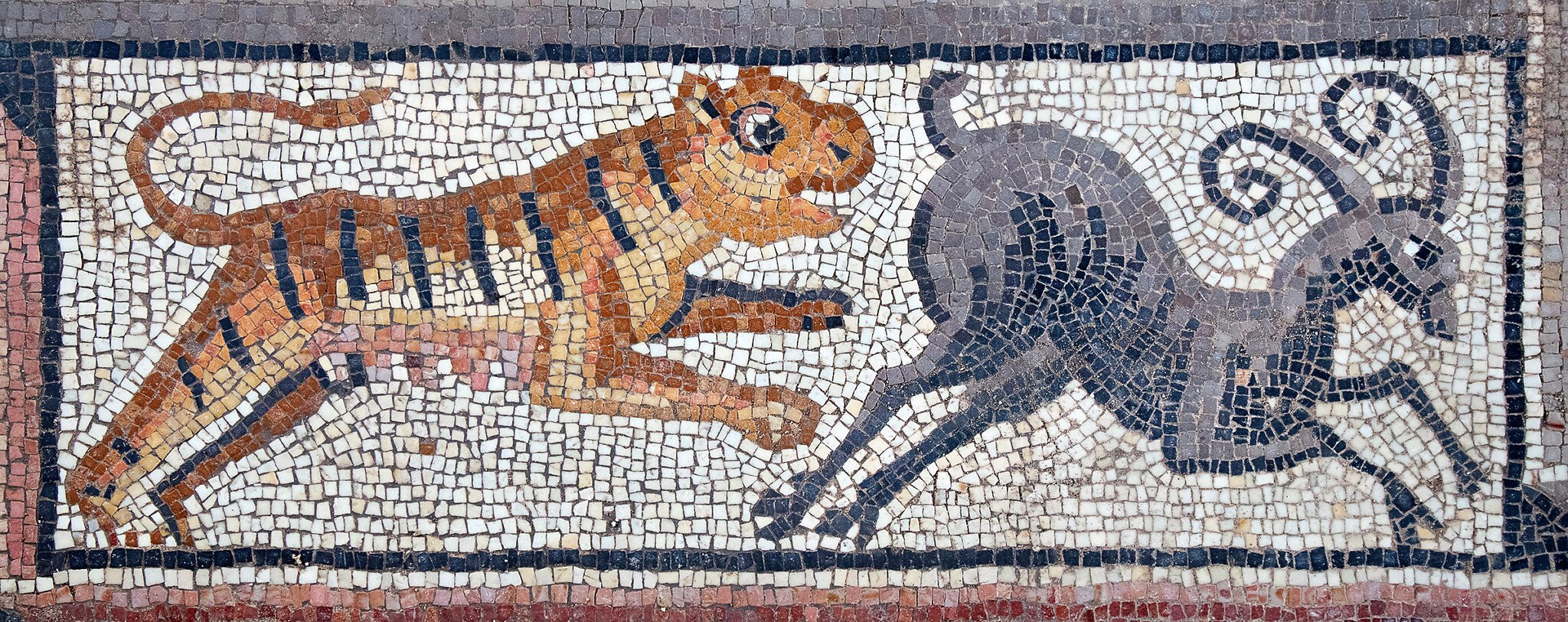
Huqoq synagogue mosaic of tiger chasing Nubian ibex

Bedouin have historically raised young Nubian ibex in integrated herds with domestic goats, with whom the ibex can viably interbreed. The Ma'aza Bedouin of Egypt's Eastern Desert have named several locations based on ibex presence and behavior. In Israel, the Azāzmeh tribal wasm (symbol) on petroglyphs was made by modifying older ibex rock art. Bedouin have traditionally hunted ibex for food and skin, and were often historically hired as hunters and guides by British and Egyptian officials. More recently, some Bedouin in the Sinai region have worked as protectors of ibex and other wildlife. In an anthropological study, members of the Sinai's Gebaliya Bedouin reported that they appreciate the beauty of ibex, and often enjoy seeing them on the landscape.

In Yemen, the ibex is a longstanding symbol of national identity, representing many positive attributes of the Yemeni people. An annual National Ibex Day, on 22 January, has been proposed to help protect the animal.

The Nubian ibex in particular was in the BBC documentary Life, and featured prominently in the popular television documentary series Planet Earth (episode five, "Deserts"). They were featured in the 2023 PBS series Evolution Earth, which highlighted their urbanization in Israel.

== See also ==
- List of mammals of Israel
- List of animals in the Bible
- List of mammals of Jordan
- List of mammals of Egypt
