= Agnes Igoye =

Ugandan social worker and campaigner against human trafficking

Agnes Igoye (born 8 March 1972) is a Ugandan social worker and campaigner against human trafficking. She serves as the country's Deputy chair of the National Prevention of Trafficking in Persons office – Uganda in addition to being the Training Manager at the country's Directorate of Citizenship and Immigration Control. She is also the founder of Huts for Peace and Coming Home, a rehabilitation center that provides assistance to orphan children, some of whom were abducted and trafficked.

== Background and education ==
Igoye was born the third of eight children to teachers Odet Francis and Regina Ariokot Odet in eastern Uganda in Kaboloi village, Pallisa district. Due to insurgency and her father constantly transferred, she attended a number of primary schools including Pallisa Girl's Primary School, Kitante Primary School, and Nagalama Primary School. She was later admitted to Trinity College Nabbingo for her ordinary and advanced level education.

She received her Undergraduate degree in Social Sciences from Makerere University in 1996 and a Masters thereafter from the same institution. According to the East African Diaspora Media Watch, she later studied management at Uganda Management Institute before winning the Fulbright/Hubert Humphrey Fellowships. Between 2010 and 2011, Igoye attended the University of Oxford in the United Kingdom as a Fulbright/Hubert Humphrey Fellow in to study forced migration and simultaneously enrolled for Hubert H. Humphrey Fellowship at the University of Minnesota in the United States where she studied Human trafficking, Policy and Prevention.

In August 2016, she joined Harvard University on full scholarship to pursue a Mid-Career Masters in Public administration (MC/MPA) in the Edward S. Mason program at the Kennedy School. She graduated the following year as a Mason Fellow in the Mid-Career/Master in Public Administration Program.

After graduation she joined Uganda's Ministry Of Internal Affairs in 1996 as an Immigration officer and was later promoted to the rank of a Senior Immigration Officer Currently she works as the Training Manager at the Directorate of Citizenship & Immigration Control and is the Deputy National Coordinator Anti Human trafficking Taskforce.

== Career ==
After graduation she joined Uganda's Ministry Of Internal Affairs in 1996 as an Immigration officer and was later promoted to the rank of a Senior Immigration Officer Currently she works as the Training Manager at the Directorate of Citizenship & Immigration Control and is the Deputy National Coordinator Anti Human trafficking Taskforce. Igoye has stated that as a 14-year-old, she escaped human traffickers which motivates the nature of work she is involved in.

She regularly goes on speaking tours to raise awareness on human trafficking.

She is a founder of the Huts for Peace initiative, in Gulu District which helps construct homes for especially women who have been internally displaced by insurgencies.

== Awards ==
Igoye has been the recipient of a number of awards such as the 2016 Diller-Diane von Furstenberg International Award, University of Minnesota's Distinguished Leadership Award for Internationals in 2014, and made the 2017 Clinton Global Initiative University Alumni Honor Roll.
