= Women Wage Peace =

Israeli grassroots peace movement

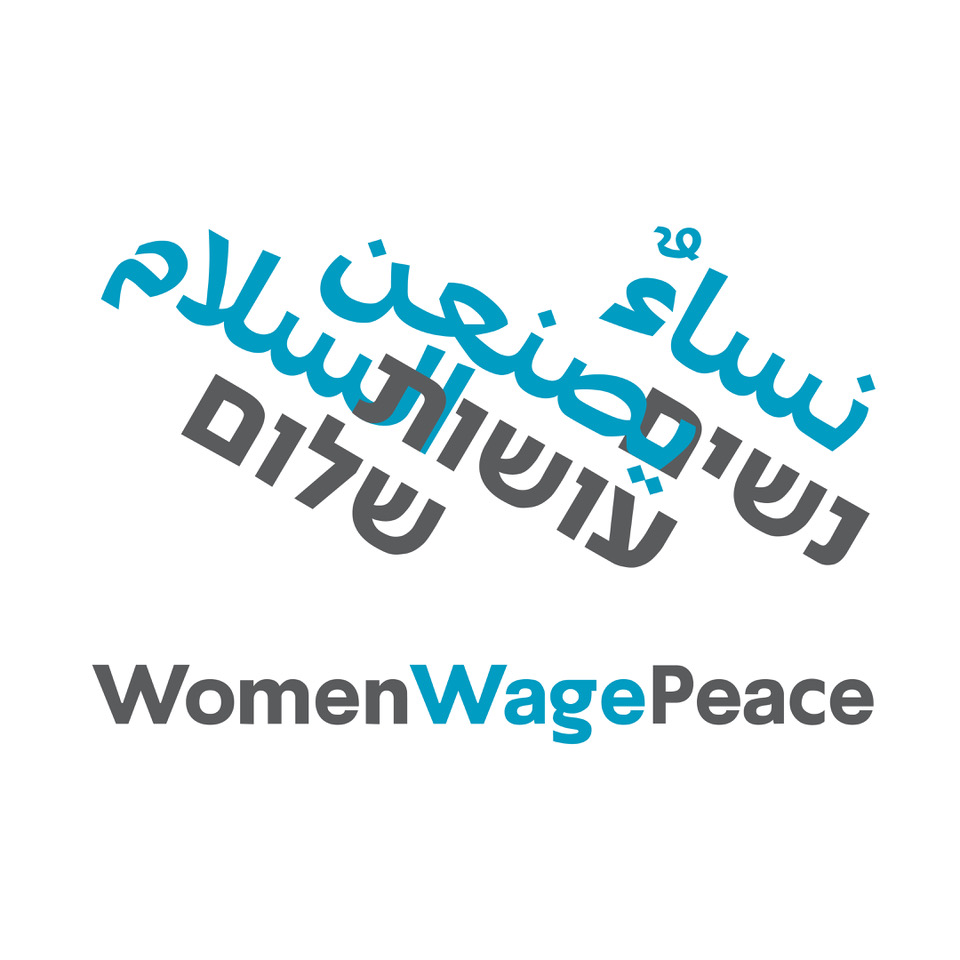
- Formation: 2014
- Directors: Vivian Silver, Yael Braudo-Bahat
- Website: www.womenwagepeace.org.il/en/

Women Wage Peace (WWP; Hebrew: נשים עושות שלום, romanized: Nashim Osot Shalom; Arabic: نساء يصنعن السلام) is an Israeli grassroots peace movement, formed shortly after the Gaza War in 2014. Its primary goal is to prevent future wars and promote a non-violent, respectful, and mutually accepted solution to the Israeli-Palestinian conflict, with the active participation of women from diverse political and religious backgrounds through all stages of negotiations.

== Origin ==
While originally started by Israeli women, including peace activist Vivian Silver, the movement has worked to build connections with Palestinian women, also reaching out to both women and men of many other local regions and religious backgrounds. It was inspired by similar women's movements in Northern Ireland and Liberia, where women of different faiths had united to help resolve violent conflicts. Inspiration also came from the Four Mothers movement, established in 1997, which ultimately influenced Israel's military withdrawal from South Lebanon. For colors representing the movement, white was chosen to symbolize peace and turquoise, a blend of blue and green, to represent both the Israeli and Palestinian flags.

The movement has its basis on two main objectives:

1. To encourage peace negotiations between Israel and the Palestinian Authority
2. To urge the enforcement of UN resolution 1325 which "reaffirms the important role of women in the prevention and resolution of conflicts"

== Membership ==
As of May 2017, Women Wage Peace had more than 20,000 members and supporters. There are 45,000 Israeli members as of 2023.

== Recognition ==
Women Wage Peace along with Women of the Sun and EcoPeace were nominated for the 2024 Nobel Peace Prize by academics at the Free University Amsterdam for their efforts to build peace between Israelis and Palestinians. In addition, WWP co-founder and leader Yael Admi has been selected as one of the 2024 TIME Women of the year.

== Activities ==
=== Demonstrations and events ===
In 2014, Women Wage Peace organized a train journey to Sderot in 2014, attended by a thousand women dressed in white, symbolizing peace. The following year in March 2015 before the Israel general election, members of the movement protested outside the Israel Parliament building in Jerusalem, calling for politicians to put more priority on peace talks in the general election debates.

In the summer of 2015, a collective fast was staged outside Israeli Prime Minister Benjamin Netanyahu's formal residence, timing their symbolic 50-day Operation Protective Fast to coincide with the anniversary of Operation Protective Edge in Gaza the previous year. Approximately 300 women and men participated, joining the protest in shifts. In early September, a week after the hunger strike had concluded, four members of the movement were invited to a formal meeting with Netanyahu to discuss the possibility of renewing peace talks with Palestine.

In October 2016, over 3000 Israeli and Palestinian women participated in a March for Peace from Northern Israel to Jerusalem, ending with a rally in front of Prime Minister Netanyahu's formal residence. Among the speakers at the rally was Leymah Gbowee, a Liberian peace activist and 2011 Nobel Peace Prize laureate known for helping to end the Second Liberian Civil War. Following the march, Canadian-Israeli singer and activist Yael Deckelbaum of Habanot Nechama collaborated with Women Wage Peace to create the song "Prayer of the Mothers", which included clips of a speech by Gbowee. As of May 2017, the music video had received over 3 million views on YouTube.

On May 18, 2017, members of Women Wage Peace met in Tel Aviv in advance of U.S. President Donald Trump's first visit to Israel, creating a human chain that spelled out "ready for peace". In the fall of 2017 approximately 30,000 people participated in a WWP rally in Jerusalem's Independence Park, marking the culmination of a two-week "peace walk" that began in Sderot and traversed through Israel and the territories. The event featured thousands of Israeli and Palestinian women advocating for a peace agreement. Notable participants included Adina Bar-Shalom, founder of an ultra-Orthodox women's college, and former MK Shachiv Shnaan, whose son was killed in a terror attack.

=== Education and cultural activities ===
The movement has continued to remain active, building pressure and awareness around the need for peaceful conflict resolution.

Since 2015, they have organized over 250 screenings of the documentary Pray the Devil Back to Hell, with subtitles in Hebrew, Arabic, and Russian. This film tells the story of how Liberian women, led by social worker and activist Leymah Gbowee, successfully ended decades of violence.

In March 2017, at an International Women's Day reception in Tel Aviv, more than a dozen foreign female ambassadors pledged their support for the Women Wage Peace movement. The Israeli music network Constant Culture announced May 13, 2017 that they had created an EDM compilation album in support of peace, with all proceeds going to Women Wage Peace.

=== Collaborations ===
They have collaborated multiple times with the Palestinian organization Women of the Sun, who have a similar objective. In late 2021 and early 2022, both groups worked together on forming a "joint platform". In March 2022, coalitions from both groups met at Neve Midbar Beach on the Dead Sea for a peace conference.

On October 4, 2023, just days before the 2023 Hamas-led attack on Israel which included the murder of the organisation's founder Vivian Silver by Hamas militants, the two groups organized a peace march in Jerusalem, from the Tolerance Monument to the Armon Hanatziv neighborhood.

== See also ==
- Women's Peace Train
