= Priti Patkar =

Indian social worker and activist

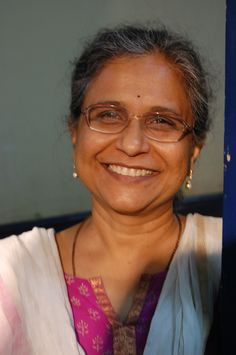
- Priti Patkar
- Born: Mumbai
- Other names: Priti tai, Preeti Patkar
- Education: Tata Institute of Social Sciences, Nirmala Niketan College of Social Work
- Known for: her work with women and children in red light districts of Mumbai. She conceptualised and founded world's first night care center for children of women working in red light districts.

Priti Patkar is an Indian social worker and human rights activist. She is the co-founder and director of the organisation Prerana, which works in the red-light districts of Mumbai, India to protect children vulnerable to commercial sexual exploitation and trafficking.

== Personal life ==
Priti Patkar was born in Mumbai. Her father was a government servant and her mother ran a daycare program. She is a Gold Medalist from The Tata Institute of Social Sciences, Mumbai where she completed a Masters in Social Work. She is married to social activist Pravin Patkar.

== Activism ==
Priti Patkar has been working for the protection and rescue of children and women victims of human trafficking and commercial sexual exploitation for over 30 years. She founded Prerana in 1986, after a research visit for her Masters in Social Work to the Kamathipura Red Light Area – where she witnessed three generations of women soliciting customers on the same street.

She is accredited with several path-breaking social interventions for the protection and dignity of children and women victims of human trafficking and commercial sexual exploitation.

Patkar has to her credit the largest number of legal interventions and writ petitions in India to protect the rights and dignity of child and female victims of child sexual exploitation and trafficking.
