= Women of the Sun (organization) =

Palestinian women's organization

- Founded: July 2021; 4 years ago
- Founder: Reem Al-Hajajreh
- Founded at: Bethlehem, West Bank
- Director: Reem Al-Hajajreh

Women of the Sun (نساء الشمس) is a Palestinian women's organization based in Bethlehem. It was founded in July 2021 and is devoted to a peaceful resolution in the Israel-Palestine conflict. The organization's name is an allusion to Men in the Sun, the 1962 novel by Ghassan Kanafani.

They are a member of Alliance for Middle East Peace. In October 2023, the organization had about 2,800 members: 2,500 in the West Bank and 300 in Gaza. By February 2024, 27 members from the Gaza Strip were known to have died or been killed. By May 2024, the organization had an estimated 3,000 members.

== Work ==
=== Collaborations ===
They have collaborated multiple times with the Israeli organization Women Wage Peace, who have a similar objective.

In late 2021 and early 2022, both groups worked together on forming a "joint platform". In March 2022, coalitions from both groups met at Neve Midbar Beach on the Dead Sea for a peace conference. The conference was decried by the General Union of Palestinian Women, who said it was "normalizing" the Israeli occupation of Palestinian land, and called Women of the Sun a "fictitious" organization.

On October 4, 2023, just days before the onset of the Gaza war, the two groups organized a peace march in Jerusalem, from the Monument of Tolerance to the Armon Hanatziv neighborhood.

=== Aid work ===
Women of the Sun has offered programs relating to trauma, environmental protection, and women's empowerment.

In response to the Israel-Hamas war, they have worked to send food, menstrual products, and supplies for mothers to about 50 families in the Gaza Strip. They also worked to collect supplies for West Bank families, who have been economically impacted by the war. In addition, the organization started a "trauma-healing program" and a WhatsApp group chat for affected women.

== Awards ==
In December 2023, Women of the Sun and Women Wage Peace were both nominated by the Nobel Peace Prize Working Group of the Centre for Peace and Conflict Studies at the Vrije Universiteit Amsterdam for the 2024 Nobel Peace Prize.

Women of the Sun founder and director Reem Al-Hajajreh was selected as one of the 2024 TIME Women of the year. Later in 2024, Women of the Sun and Women Wage Peace both received the Hillary Rodham Clinton award from the Georgetown Institute for Women, Peace & Security.
