= Yael Braudo-Bahat =

Israeli peace activist

- יעל ברוידא-בהט
- Education: Tel Aviv University
- Known for: Co-founder of Women Wage Peace
- Awards: BBC 100 Women (2023)

Dr. Yael Braudo-Bahat (Hebrew: יעל ברוידא-בהט) is an Israeli peace activist, academic, and the current co-director of Women Wage Peace.

== Career ==
After a bachelor's degree in law and accounting, Braudo-Bahat gained her master's in law, with a thesis on the law around breastfeeding. She gained a PhD in law from Tel Aviv University, specializing in family law, feminism and legal history. Her PhD thesis focused on Israeli women's organizations in Israel's first few decades, and their activity in securing property rights for women.

Braudo-Bahet has been an external lecturer at Tel Aviv University, and deputy editor of the journal Theoretical Inquiries in Law. From 2017 until 2018, Braudo-Bahat was a visiting professor in Israel studies at York University in Canada.

== Activism ==
Braudo-Bahat and fellow peace activist Vivian Silver founded Women Wage Peace together in 2014. The organization has over 50,000 members. Stressing the importance of women in the peace process, the WWP seeks a negotiated political resolution to the Israeli-Palestinian conflict. Since 2021 it has collaborated with a Palestinian sister movement, Women of the Sun. By February 2023, Braudo-Bahat was the organization's co-director. As a member of Women Wage Peace, Braudo-Bahat has criticized government policies that restrict the entrance of Palestinian activists into Israel, and the continued Gaza war.

Braudo-Bahat has been interviewed by ABC News, France 24, and NPR's Here & Now about the peace movement's response to the Gaza war.

Silver, cited by Braudo-Bahat as a mentor at Women Wage Peace to whom she owed much, was killed by Hamas in their attack on Israel on 7 October 2023.

== Personal life ==
Braudo-Bahat's father was a veteran of the Yom Kippur War.

== Recognition ==
In November 2023, Braudo-Bahat was named to the BBC's 100 Women list.

== Publications ==
- Braudo-Bahat, Yael (2016-04-20). "Towards a Relational Conceptualization of the Right to Personal Autonomy". American University Journal of Gender, Social Policy & the Law. 25 (2): 111–154. SSRN 2765759.
