= List of mammals of Portugal =

This list shows the IUCN Red List status of the 93 mammal species occurring in Portugal. One of them is critically endangered, three are endangered, eleven are vulnerable, and one is near threatened. The following tags are used to highlight each species' status as assessed on the respective IUCN Red List published by the International Union for Conservation of Nature:

Icons which state each species' global IUCN status:
| EX | Extinct | No reasonable doubt that the last individual has died |
| EN | Endangered | Facing an extremely high risk of extinction in the wild |
| VU | Vulnerable | Facing a high risk of extinction in the wild |
| NT | Near Threatened | Doesn't meet any criteria that would categorise it as risking extinction but likely to in the future |
| LC | Least Concern | No current identifiable risks to this species |
| DD | Data Deficient | Inadequate information to make an assessment of the risks to this species |

== Order: Rodentia (rodents) ==
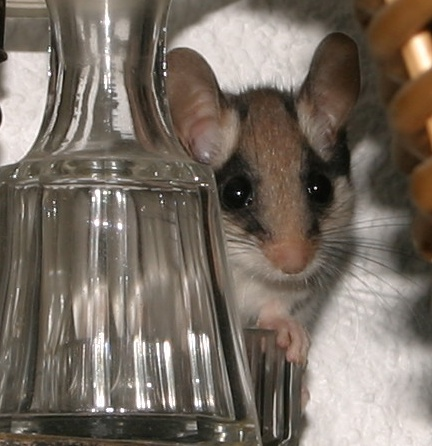
Garden dormouse closeup

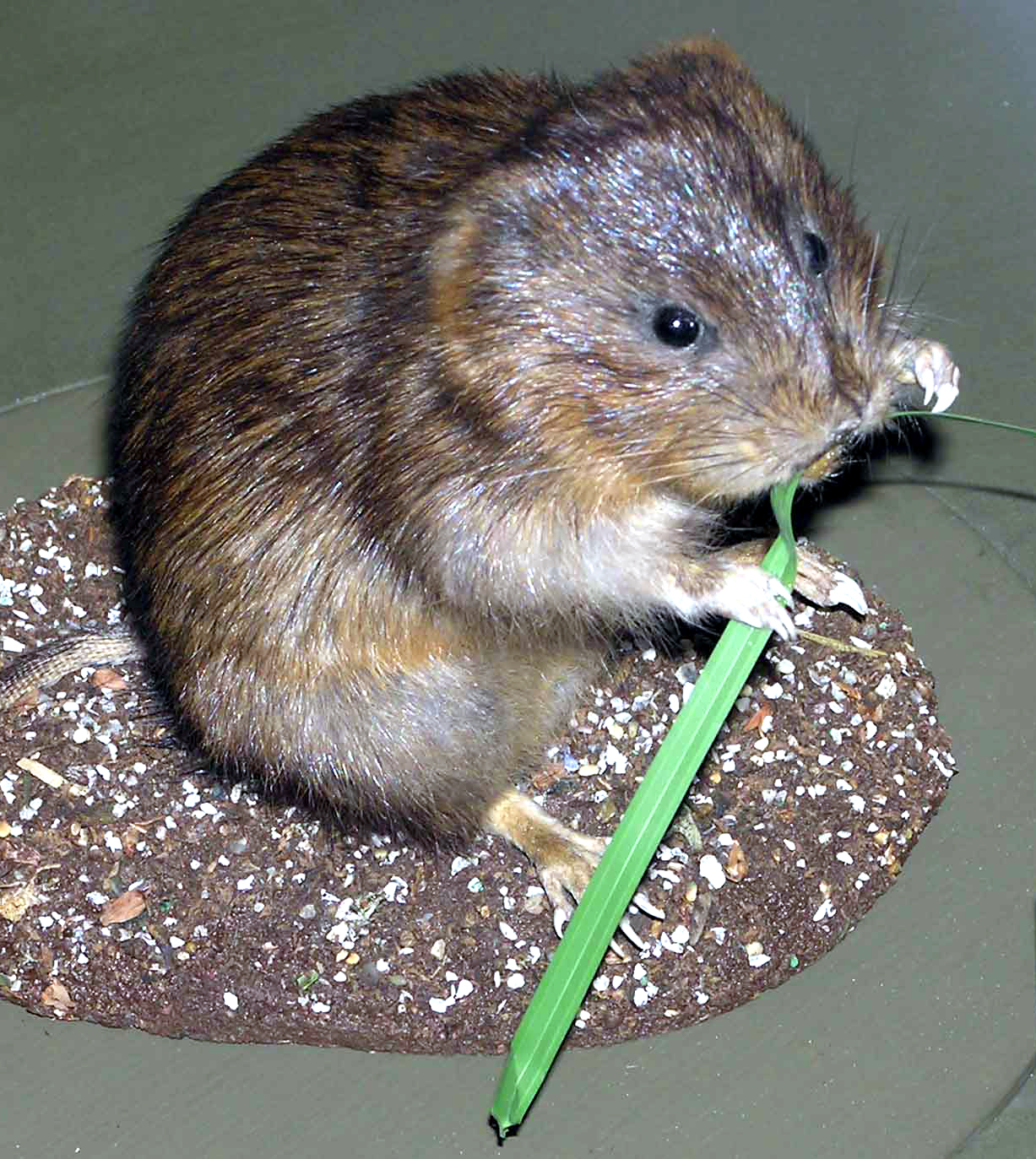
Water vole

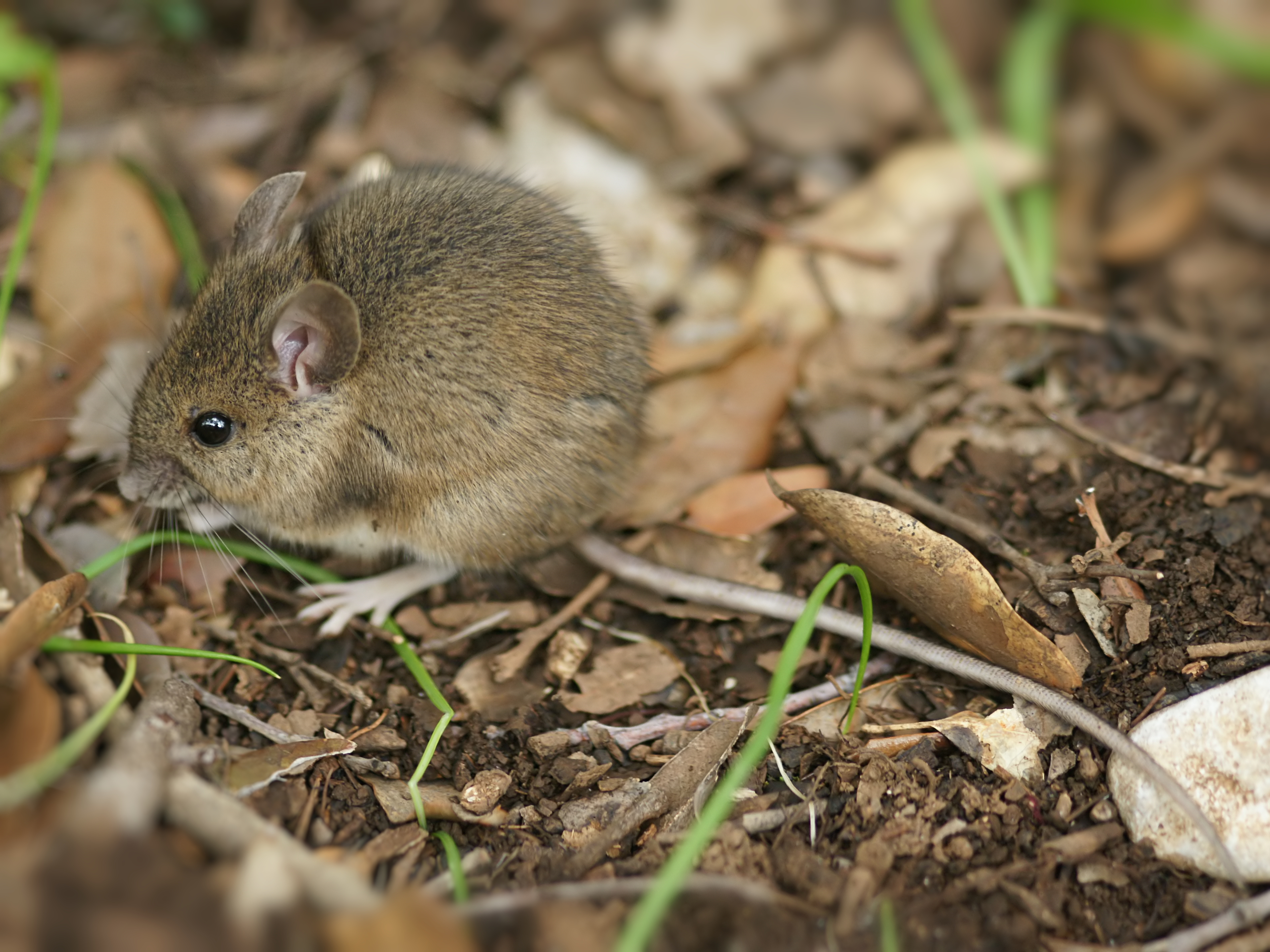
Wood mouse

Rodents make up the largest order of mammals, with over 40% of mammalian species. They have two incisors in the upper and lower jaw which grow continually and must be kept short by gnawing.

- Suborder: Sciurognathi
  - Family: Sciuridae (squirrels)
    - Subfamily: Sciurinae
      - Genus: Sciurus
        - Red squirrel, S. vulgaris LC
  - Family: Gliridae (dormice)
    - Subfamily: Leithiinae
      - Genus: Eliomys
        - Garden dormouse, E. quercinus NT
  - Family: Cricetidae (hamsters, voles, lemmings)
    - Subfamily: Arvicolinae
      - Genus: Arvicola
        - Southwestern water vole, A. sapidus VU
        - European water vole, A. amphibius LC
      - Genus: Microtus
        - Cabrera's vole, M. cabrerae NT
        - Field vole, M. agrestis LC
        - Mediterranean pine vole, M. duodecimcostatus LC
        - Lusitanian pine vole, M. lusitanicus LC
  - Family: Muridae (mice and rats)
    - Subfamily: Murinae
      - Genus: Apodemus
        - Wood mouse, A. sylvaticus LC
      - Genus: Mus
        - House mouse, M. musculus LC
        - Algerian mouse, M. spretus LC
      - Genus: Rattus
        - Black rat, R. rattus LC
        - Brown rat, R. norvegicus LC

== Order: Lagomorpha (lagomorphs) ==
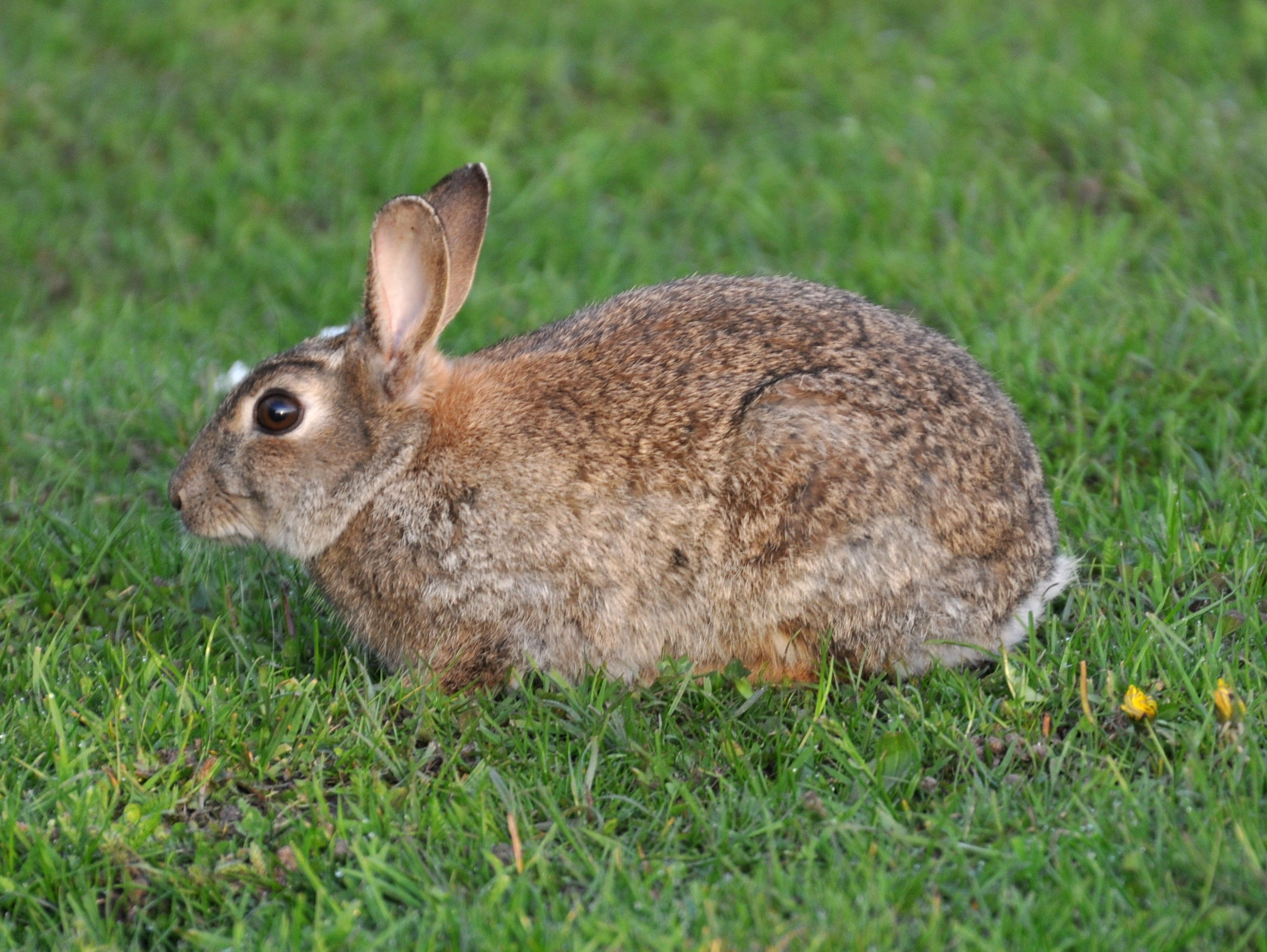
European rabbit

The lagomorphs comprise two families, Leporidae (hares and rabbits), and Ochotonidae (pikas). Though they can resemble rodents, and were classified as a superfamily in that order until the early 20th century, they have since been considered a separate order. They differ from rodents in a number of physical characteristics, such as having four incisors in the upper jaw rather than two.

- Family: Leporidae (rabbits, hares)
  - Genus: Oryctolagus
    - European rabbit, O. cuniculus EN
  - Genus: Lepus
    - Granada hare, L. granatensis LC

== Order: Erinaceomorpha (hedgehogs and gymnures) ==
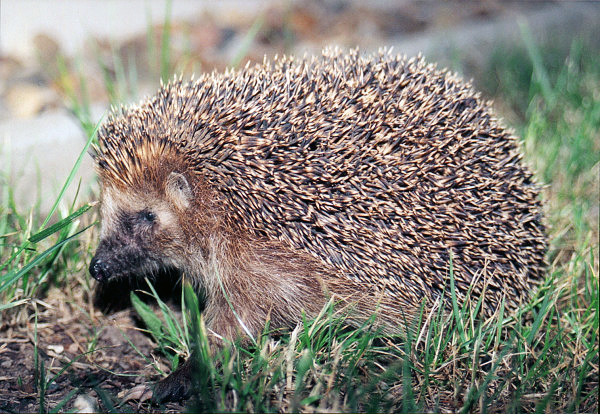
West European hedgehog

The order Erinaceomorpha contains a single family, Erinaceidae, which comprise the hedgehogs and gymnures. The hedgehogs are easily recognised by their spines while gymnures look more like large rats.

- Family: Erinaceidae (hedgehogs)
  - Subfamily: Erinaceinae
    - Genus: Erinaceus
      - West European hedgehog, E. europaeus LC

== Order: Soricomorpha (shrews, moles, and solenodons) ==
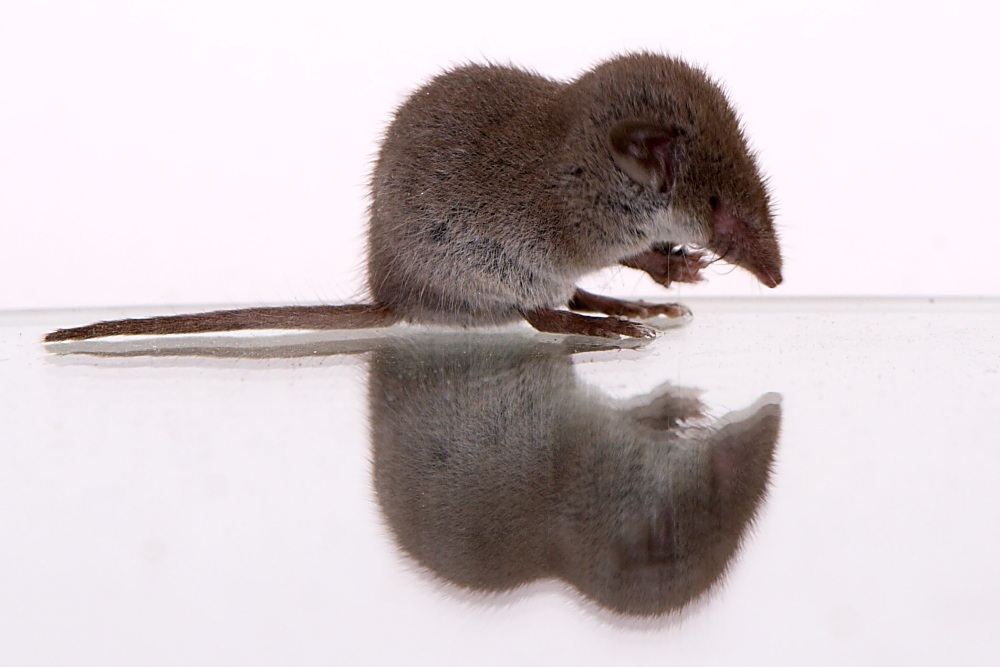
Lesser white-toothed shrew

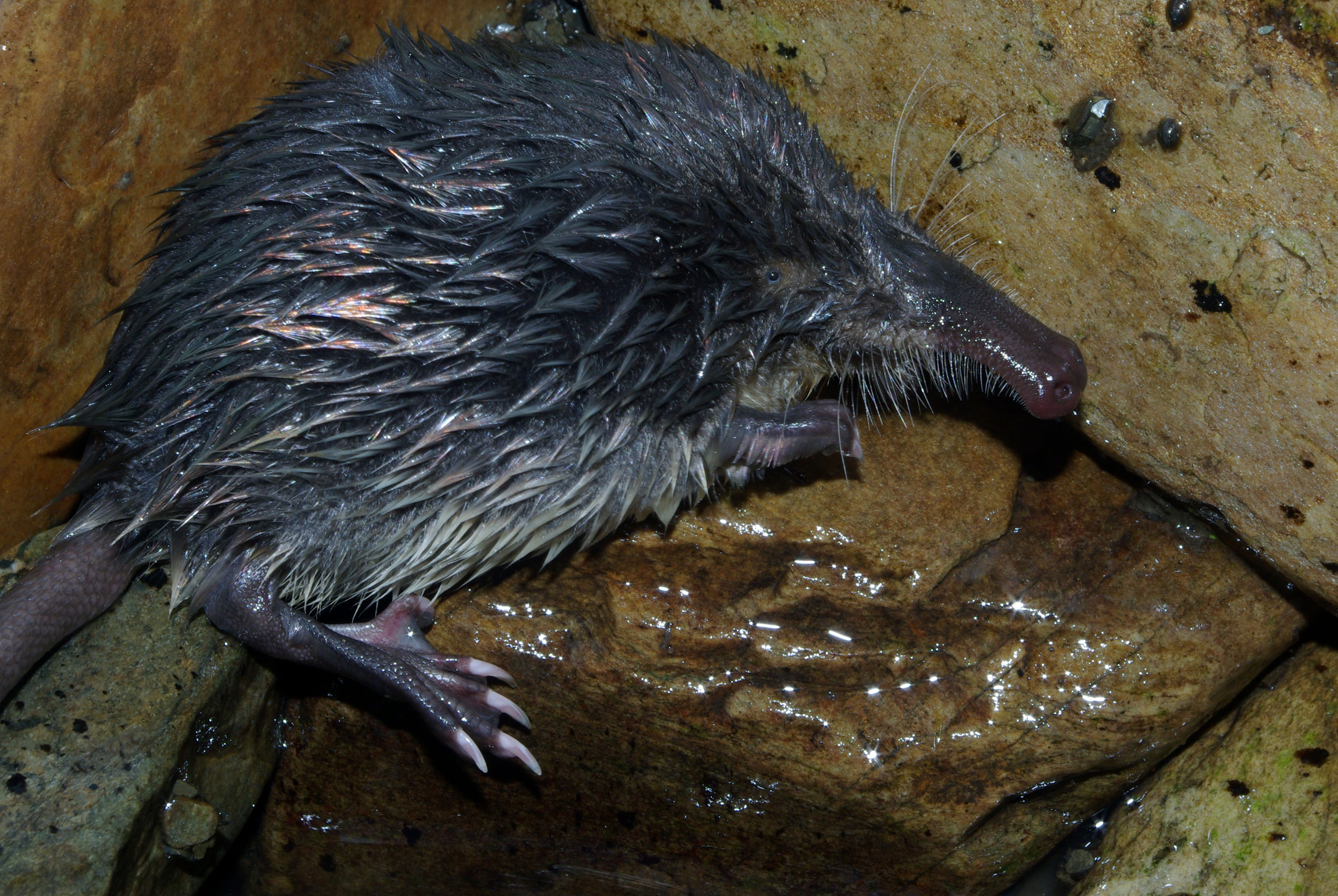
Pyrenean desman

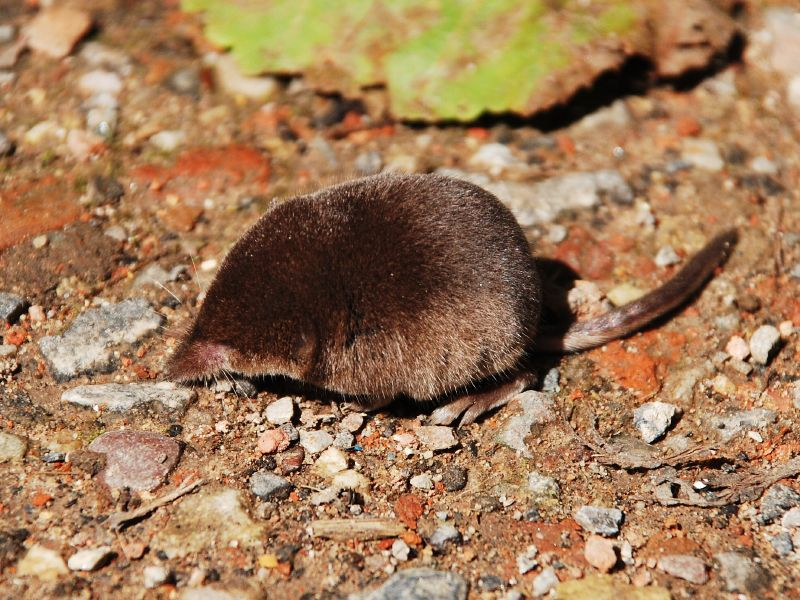
Eurasian pygmy shrew

The Soricomorpha are insectivorous mammals. The shrews and solenodons resemble mice while the moles are stout-bodied burrowers.

- Family: Soricidae (shrews)
  - Subfamily: Crocidurinae
    - Genus: Crocidura
      - Greater white-toothed shrew, C. russula LC
      - Lesser white-toothed shrew, C. suaveolens LC
    - Genus: Suncus
      - Etruscan shrew, S. etruscus LC
  - Subfamily: Soricinae
    - Tribe: Nectogalini
      - Genus: Neomys
        - Southern water shrew, N. anomalus LC
    - Tribe: Soricini
      - Genus: Sorex
        - Iberian shrew, S. granarius LC
        - Eurasian pygmy shrew, S. minutus LC
- Family: Talpidae (moles)
  - Subfamily: Talpinae
    - Tribe: Desmanini
      - Genus: Galemys
        - Pyrenean desman, G. pyrenaicus VU
    - Tribe: Talpini
      - Genus: Talpa
        - Iberian mole, T. occidentalis LC

== Order: Chiroptera (bats) ==
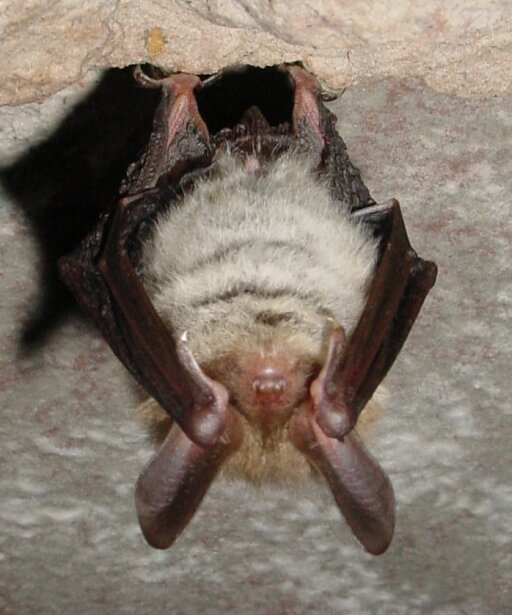
Bechstein's bat

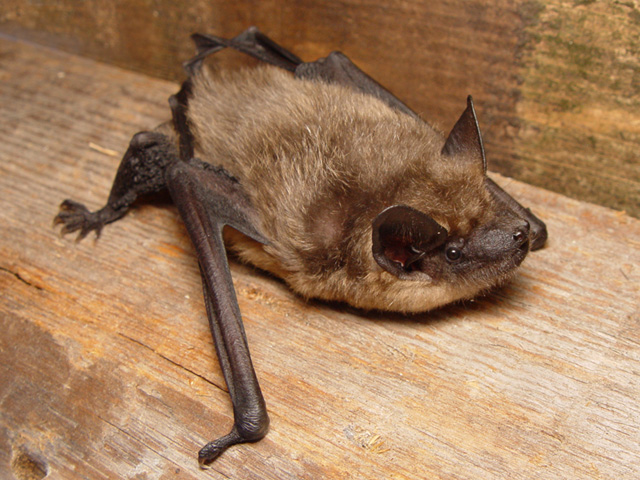
Serotine bat

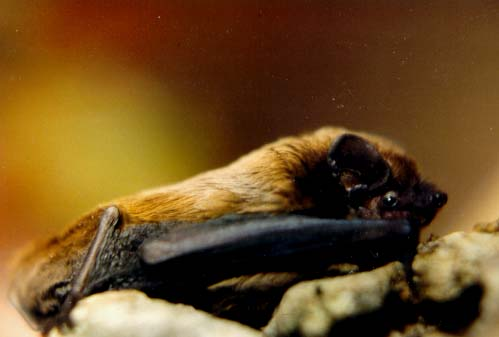
Lesser noctule

The bats' most distinguishing feature is that their forelimbs are developed as wings, making them the only mammals capable of flight. Bat species account for about 20% of all mammals.

- Family: Vespertilionidae
  - Subfamily: Myotinae
    - Genus: Myotis
      - Bechstein's bat, M. bechsteini NT
      - Greater mouse-eared bat, M. myotis LC
      - Daubenton's bat, M. daubentonii LC
      - Geoffroy's bat, M. emarginatus LC
      - Escalera's bat, M. escalerai LC
      - Whiskered bat, M. mystacinus LC
      - Natterer's bat, M. nattereri LC
  - Subfamily: Vespertilioninae
    - Genus: Barbastella
      - Western barbastelle, B. barbastellus NT
    - Genus: Eptesicus
      - Serotine bat, E. serotinus LC
    - Genus: Nyctalus
      - Greater noctule bat, N. lasiopterus NT
      - Lesser noctule, N. leisleri LC
      - Azores noctule, N. azoreum VU
    - Genus: Pipistrellus
      - Madeira pipistrelle, P. maderensis VU
    - Genus: Plecotus
      - Brown long-eared bat, P. auritus LC
      - Grey long-eared bat, P. austriacus LC
- Family: Miniopteridae
  - Genus: Miniopterus
    - Common bent-wing bat, M. schreibersii VU
- Family: Molossidae
  - Genus: Tadarida
    - European free-tailed bat, T. teniotis LC
- Family: Rhinolophidae
  - Subfamily: Rhinolophinae
    - Genus: Rhinolophus
      - Mediterranean horseshoe bat, R. euryale NT
      - Greater horseshoe bat, R. ferrumequinum LC
      - Lesser horseshoe bat, R. hipposideros LC
      - Mehely's horseshoe bat, R. mehelyi VU

== Order: Cetacea (whales) ==
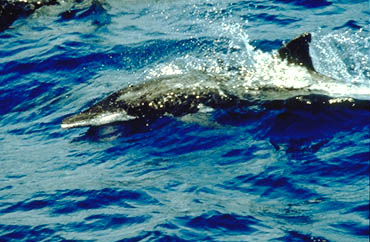
Rough-toothed dolphin

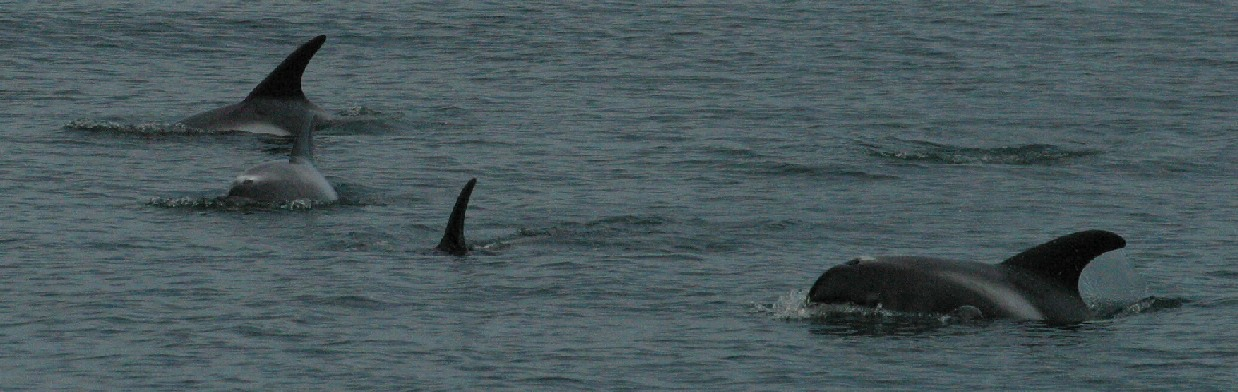
White-beaked dolphin

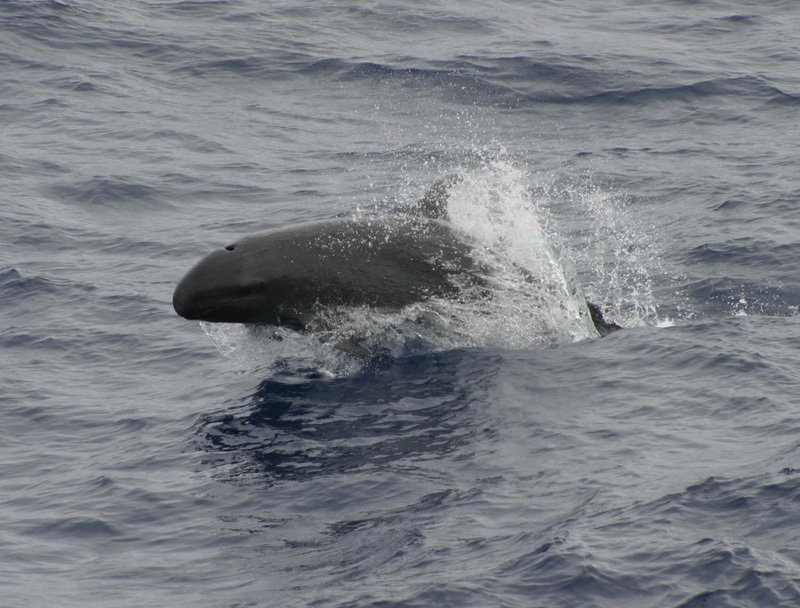
False killer whale

The order Cetacea includes whales, dolphins and porpoises. They are the mammals most fully adapted to aquatic life with a spindle-shaped nearly hairless body, protected by a thick layer of blubber, and forelimbs and tail modified to provide propulsion underwater.

- Suborder: Mysticeti
  - Family: Balaenidae
    - Genus: Eubalaena
      - North Atlantic right whale, E. glacialis EN
  - Family: Balaenopteridae
    - Subfamily: Balaenopterinae
      - Genus: Balaenoptera
        - Fin whale, B. physalus EN
        - Blue whale, B. musculus EN
- Suborder: Odontoceti
  - Superfamily: Platanistoidea
    - Family: Phocoenidae
      - Genus: Phocoena
        - Harbour porpoise, P. phocoena VU
    - Family: Physeteridae
      - Genus: Physeter
        - Sperm whale, P. macrocephalus VU
    - Family: Kogiidae
      - Genus: Kogia
        - Pygmy sperm whale, K. breviceps DD
        - Dwarf sperm whale, K. sima LC
    - Family: Ziphidae
      - Genus: Ziphius
        - Cuvier's beaked whale, Z. cavirostris DD
      - Subfamily: Hyperoodontinae
        - Genus: Hyperoodon
          - Bottlenose whale, H. ampullatus DD
        - Genus: Mesoplodon
          - Sowerby's beaked whale, M. bidens DD
          - Blainville's beaked whale, M. densirostris DD
          - True's beaked whale, M. mirus DD
    - Family: Delphinidae (marine dolphins)
      - Genus: Lagenorhynchus
        - White-beaked dolphin, Lagenorhynchus albirostris LC
      - Genus: Leucopleurus
        - Atlantic white-sided dolphin, Leucopleurus acutus LC
      - Genus: Steno
        - Rough-toothed dolphin, S. bredanensis DD
      - Genus: Tursiops
        - Bottlenose dolphin, T. truncatus DD
      - Genus: Stenella
        - Striped dolphin, S. coeruleoalba DD
        - Atlantic spotted dolphin, S. frontalis DD
      - Genus: Delphinus
        - Short-beaked common dolphin, D. delphis VU
      - Genus: Grampus
        - Risso's dolphin, G. griseus DD
      - Genus: Feresa
        - Pygmy killer whale, F. attenuata DD
      - Genus: Pseudorca
        - False killer whale, P. crassidens LC
      - Genus: Orcinus
        - Orca O. orca DD
      - Genus: Globicephala
        - Short-finned pilot whale, G. macrorhynchus LC
        - Long-finned pilot whale, G. melas LC

== Order: Carnivora (carnivorans) ==
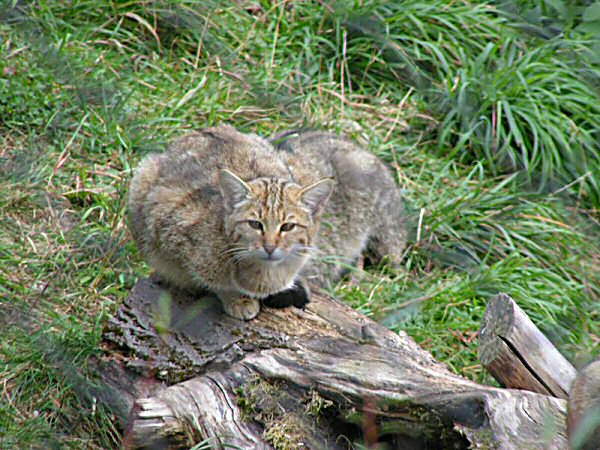
European wildcat

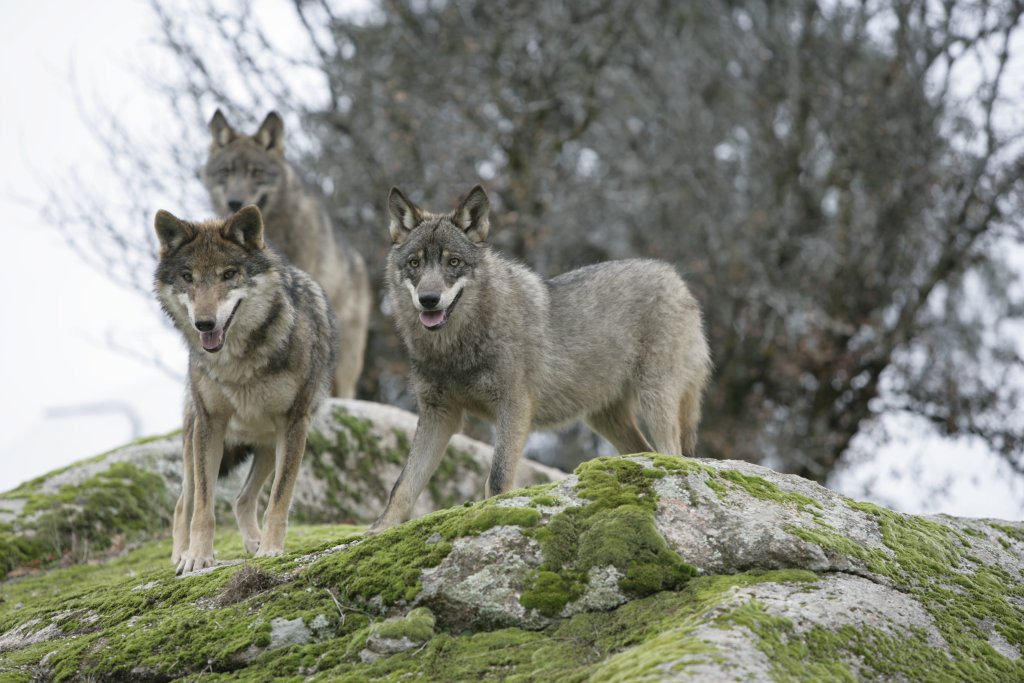
Iberian wolf

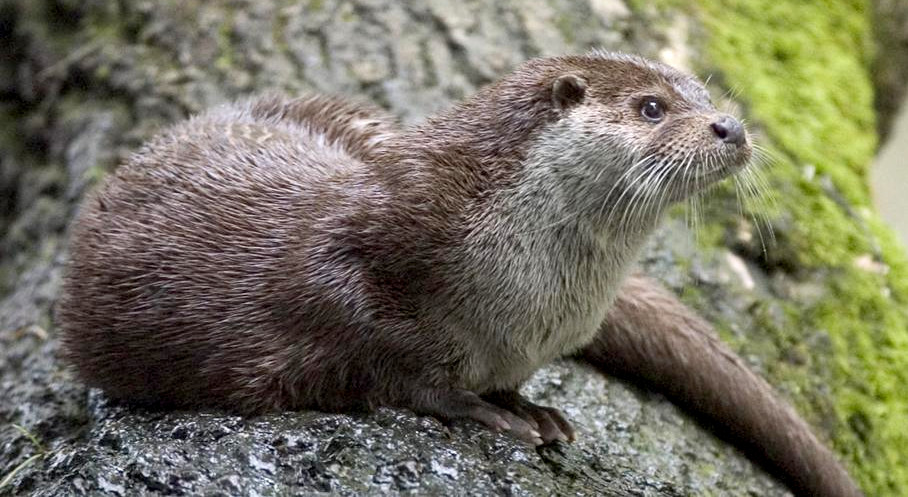
European otter

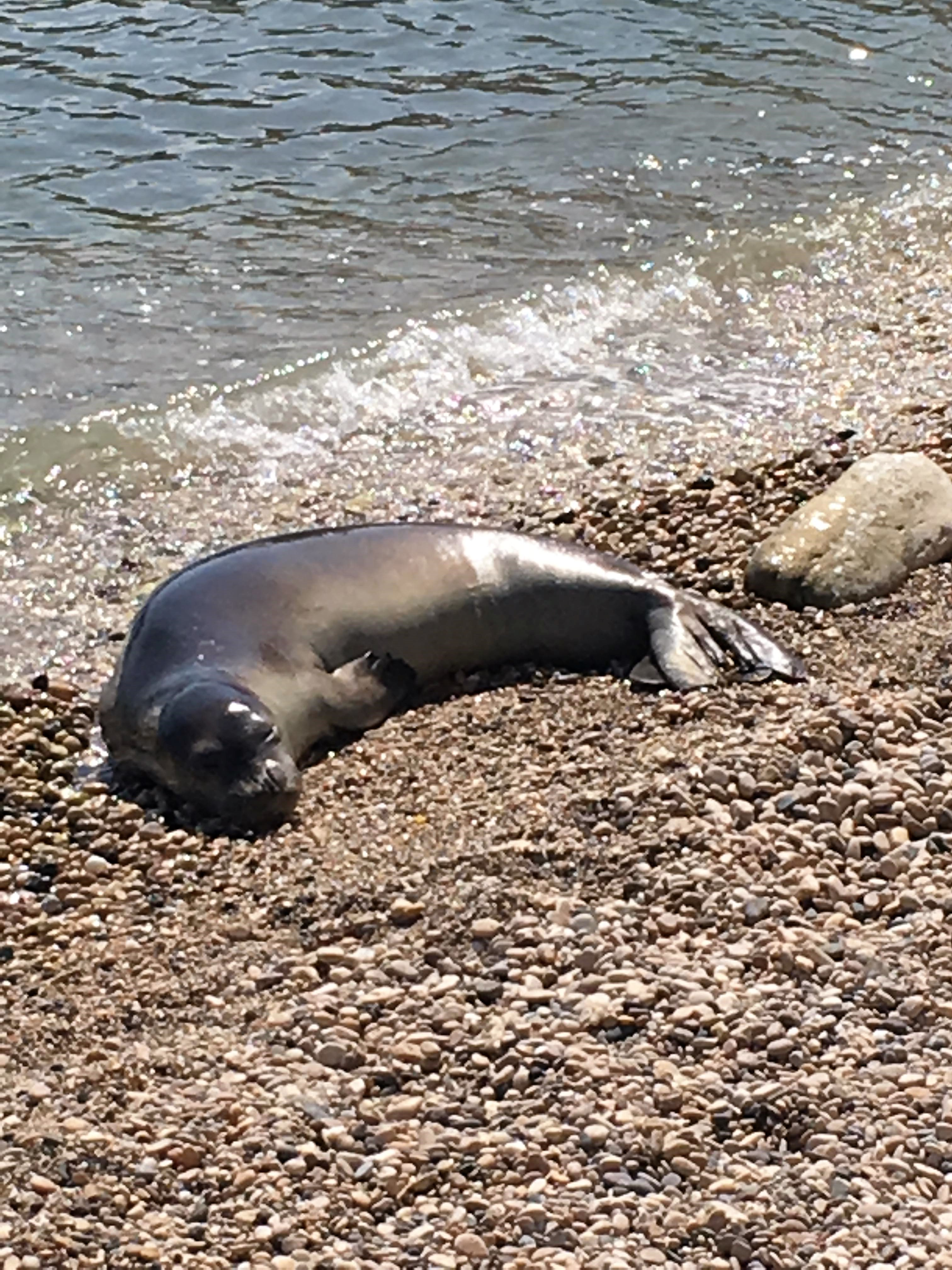
Mediterranean monk seal

There are over 260 species of carnivorans, the majority of which primarily eat meat. They have a characteristic skull shape and dentition.

- Suborder: Feliformia
  - Family: Felidae (cats)
    - Subfamily: Felinae
      - Genus: Felis
        - European wildcat, F. silvestris LC
      - Genus: Lynx
        - Iberian lynx, L. pardinus VU reintroduced
  - Family: Viverridae
    - Subfamily: Viverrinae
      - Genus: Genetta
        - Common genet, G. genetta LC introduced
  - Family: Herpestidae
    - Genus: Herpestes
      - Egyptian mongoose, H. ichneumon LC
- Suborder: Caniformia
  - Family: Canidae (dogs and foxes)
    - Genus: Vulpes
      - Red fox, V. vulpes LC
    - Genus: Canis
      - Gray wolf, C. lupus LC
        - Iberian wolf, C. l. signatus
  - Family: Mustelidae (mustelids)
    - Genus: Lutra
      - European otter, L. lutra NT
    - Genus: Martes
      - Beech marten, M. foina LC
      - European pine marten, M. martes LC
    - Genus: Meles
      - European badger, M. meles LC
    - Genus: Mustela
      - Stoat, M. erminea LC
      - Least weasel, M. nivalis LC
      - European polecat, M. putorius LC
    - Genus: Neogale
      - American mink, N. vison LC introduced
  - Family: Phocidae (earless seals)
    - Genus: Cystophora
      - Hooded seal, C. cristata VU
    - Genus: Erignathus
      - Bearded seal, Erignathus barbatus LC
    - Genus: Monachus
      - Mediterranean monk seal, M. monachus EN Madeira only
    - Genus: Phoca
      - Common seal, P. vitulina LC
    - Genus: Pusa
      - Ringed seal, P. hispida LC

== Order: Artiodactyla (even-toed ungulates) ==
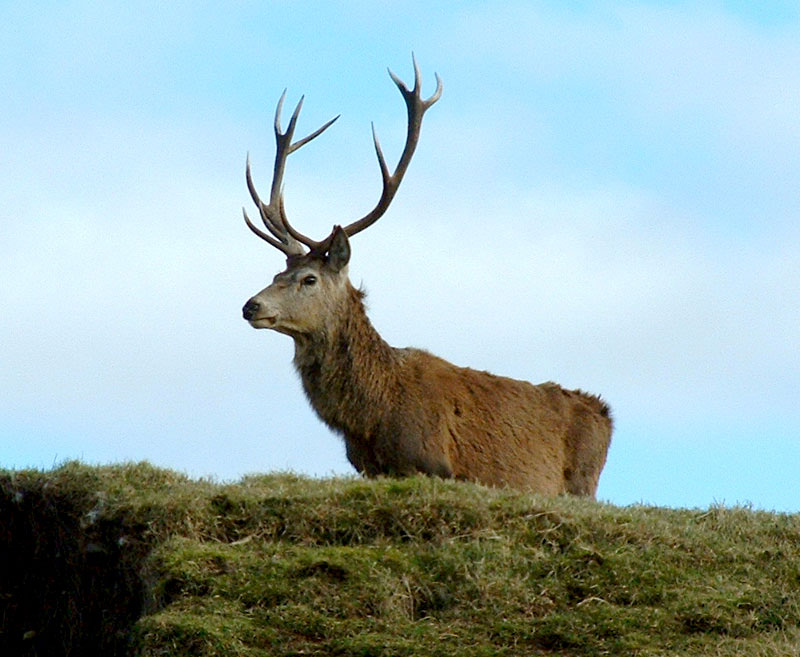
Red deer

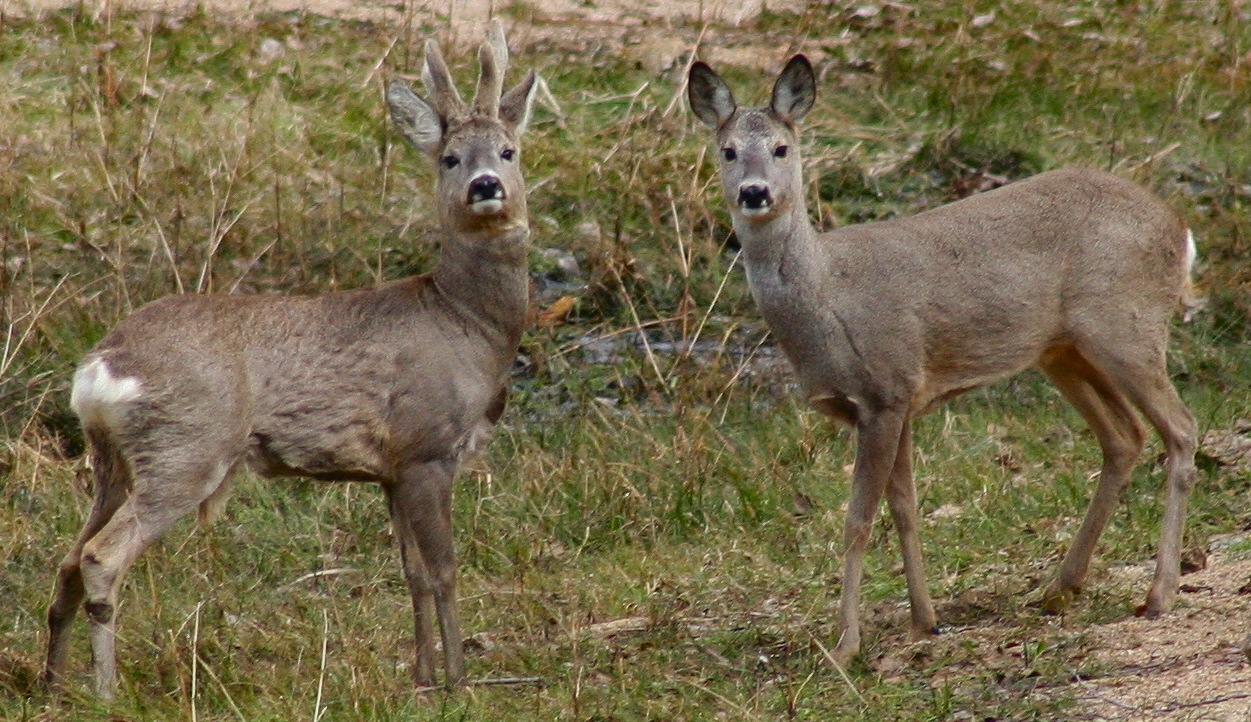
Roe deer

The even-toed ungulates are ungulates whose weight is borne about equally by the third and fourth toes, rather than mostly or entirely by the third as in perissodactyls. There are about 220 artiodactyl species, including many that are of great economic importance to humans.

- Family: Cervidae
  - Subfamily: Cervinae
    - Genus: Cervus
      - Red deer, C. elaphus LC
    - Genus: Dama
      - European fallow deer, D. dama LC introduced
  - Subfamily: Capreolinae
    - Genus: Capreolus
      - Roe deer, C. capreolus LC
- Family: Bovidae
  - Subfamily: Caprinae
    - Genus: Capra
      - Spanish ibex, C. pyrenaica LC reintroduced
        - Portuguese ibex, C. p. lusitanica EX
        - Western Spanish ibex, C. p. victoriae introduced
- Family: Suidae
  - Genus: Sus
    - Wild boar, S. scrofa LC

== Locally extinct ==
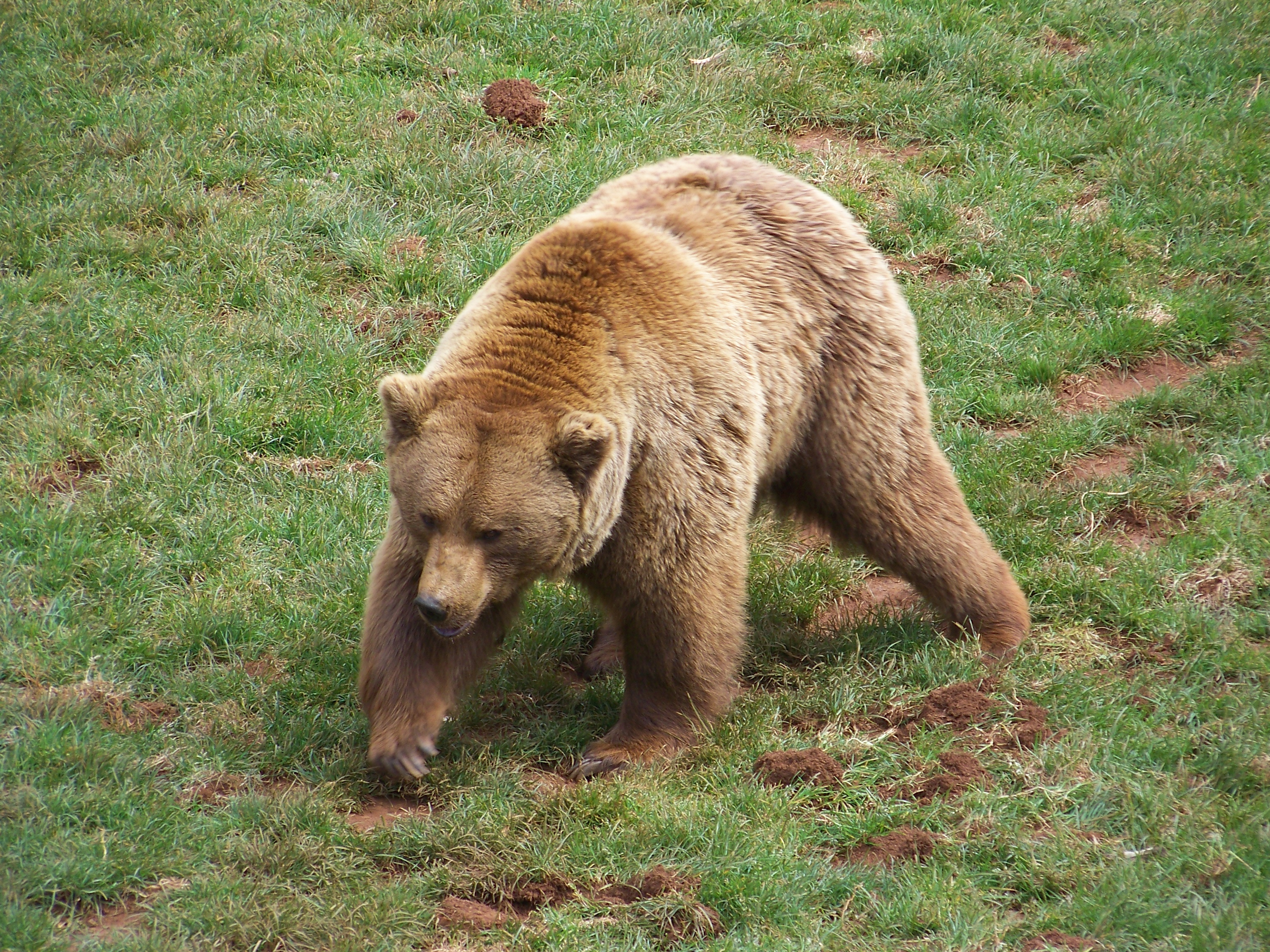
Iberian brown bear

The following species are locally extinct in the country:

- Brown bear, Ursus arctos
- Common noctule, Nyctalus noctula
- Eurasian beaver, Castor fiber
- Wild horse, Equus ferus (zebro)

== See also ==
- List of chordate orders
- List of prehistoric mammals
- Lists of mammals by region
- Mammal classification
- List of mammals described in the 2000s
