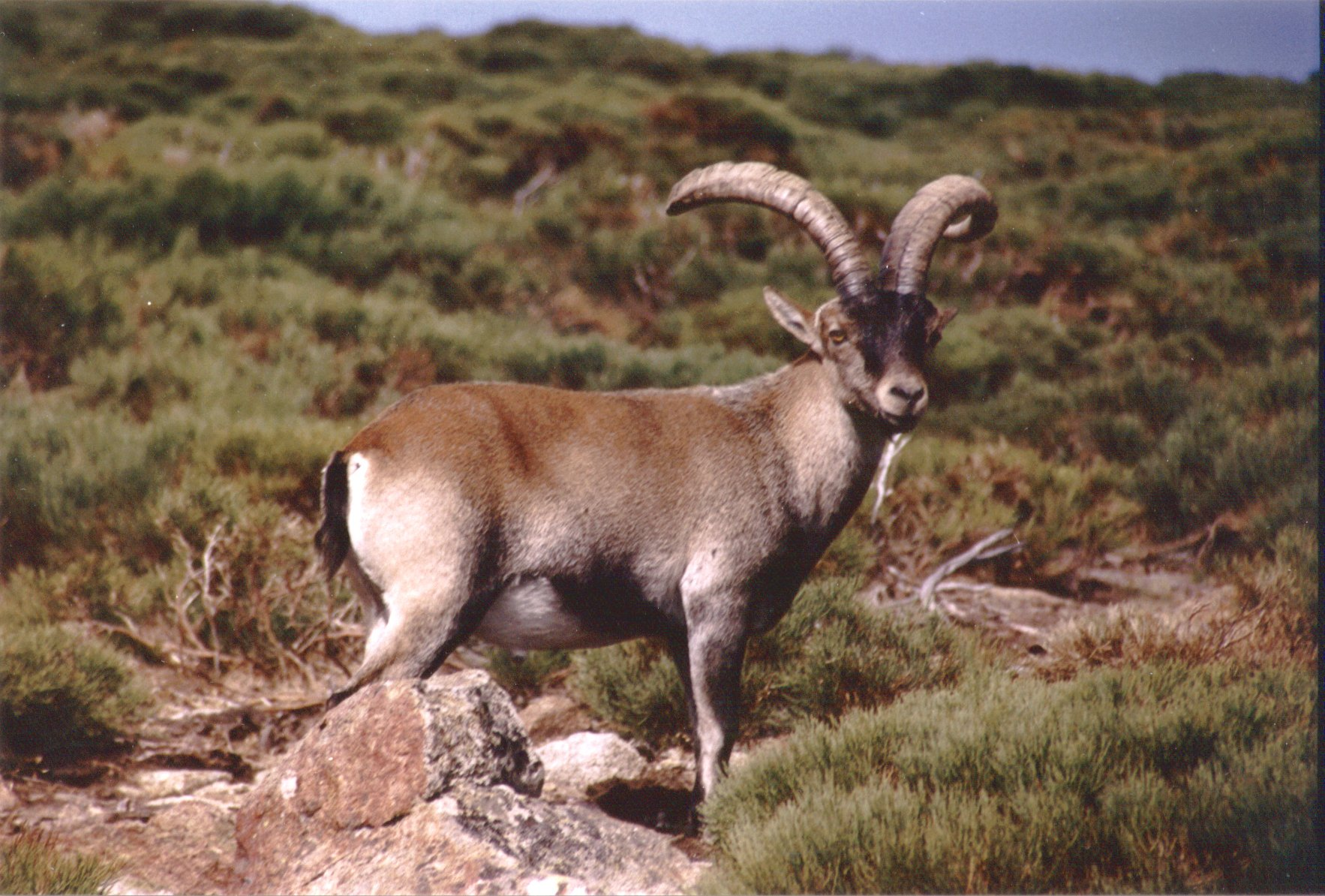
- Western Iberian ibex at Sierra de Gredos (Spain)

Scientific classification
- Kingdom: Animalia
- Phylum: Chordata
- Class: Mammalia
- Order: Artiodactyla
- Family: Bovidae
- Subfamily: Caprinae
- Genus: Capra
- Species: C. pyrenaica
- Subspecies: C. p. victoriae

Trinomial name
- Capra pyrenaica victoriae Cabrera, 1911

= Western Spanish ibex =

Western Iberian ibex

Subspecies of mammal

The Western Iberian ibex or Gredos ibex (Capra pyrenaica victoriae) is a subspecies of Iberian ibex native to Spain, in the Sierra de Gredos. It was later introduced to other sites in Spain (Las Batuecas, La Pedriza, Riaño) and to northern Portugal (Peneda-Gerês National Park) as a replacement for the extinct Portuguese ibex (C. p. lusitanica).

Remnant populations survive in the Picos de Europa and other parts of the Cantabrian Mountains, along with some reintroductions. The largest population is in the mountains north of Riaño. It is also found in southern Galicia near the border with Portugal. In northern Portugal, 100 or so survive in the Peneda-Gerês National Park, which adjoins the larger population in southern Galicia. The Western Iberian ibex has been reintroduced to several areas for hunting purposes. Because of their limited distribution and narrow ecological niche, Western Iberian ibex are more at risk of extinction than their Southeastern Iberian ibex relatives. They are more vulnerable to climatic change and parasitic diseases might pose a threat to them. Therefore, to further ensure their survival, the IUCN suggests distributing some of the Western Iberian ibex population to more areas.

The related Pyrenean ibex (Capra pyrenaica pyrenaica) which once ranged across the Pyrenees, went extinct in 2000. In 2014, a small number of Western Iberian ibex were introduced to France's Pyrenees National Park as a replacement for the Pyrenean ibex. By 2020, the population had increased to 400 individuals in the park, and neighboring Ariège.
