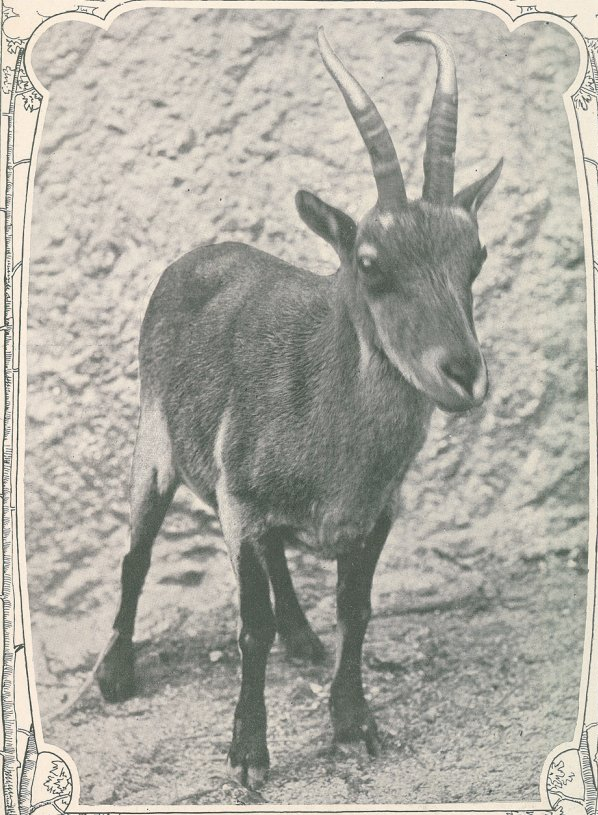
- The last and only specimen photographed, captured in Albergaria, Portugal, 20 September 1890. Details of the photo below

Conservation status
- Extinct (1892) (IUCN 3.1)

Scientific classification
- Kingdom: Animalia
- Phylum: Chordata
- Class: Mammalia
- Order: Artiodactyla
- Family: Bovidae
- Subfamily: Caprinae
- Genus: Capra
- Species: C. pyrenaica
- Subspecies: †C. p. lusitanica

Trinomial name
- †Capra pyrenaica lusitanica (Schlegel, 1872)

= Portuguese ibex =

Extinct subspecies of Iberian ibex

The Portuguese ibex (Capra pyrenaica lusitanica) is an extinct subspecies of Iberian ibex that inhabited the north mountainous zones of Portugal, Galicia, Asturias and western Cantabria. In size and colouration it was much like the Spanish animals, though inclining towards brown rather than black markings. Its horns were strikingly different from any of the other Iberian subspecies. They were only half the length of the Pyrenean ibex (about 51 cm or 20"), but were almost twice as wide, and, consequently, much closer together at their base.

== Extinction ==
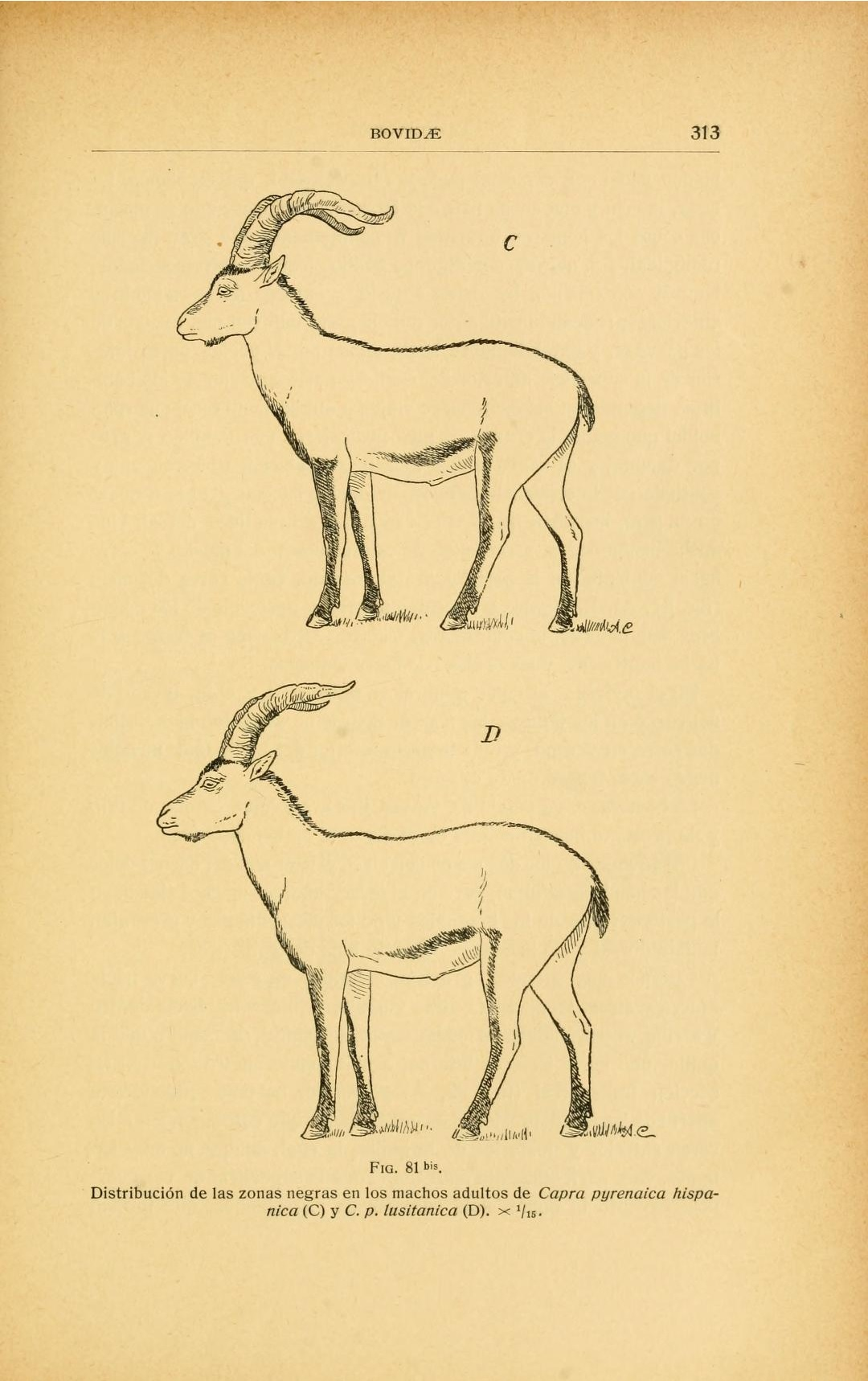
Differences between subsp. hispanica (top) and lusitanica (bottom)

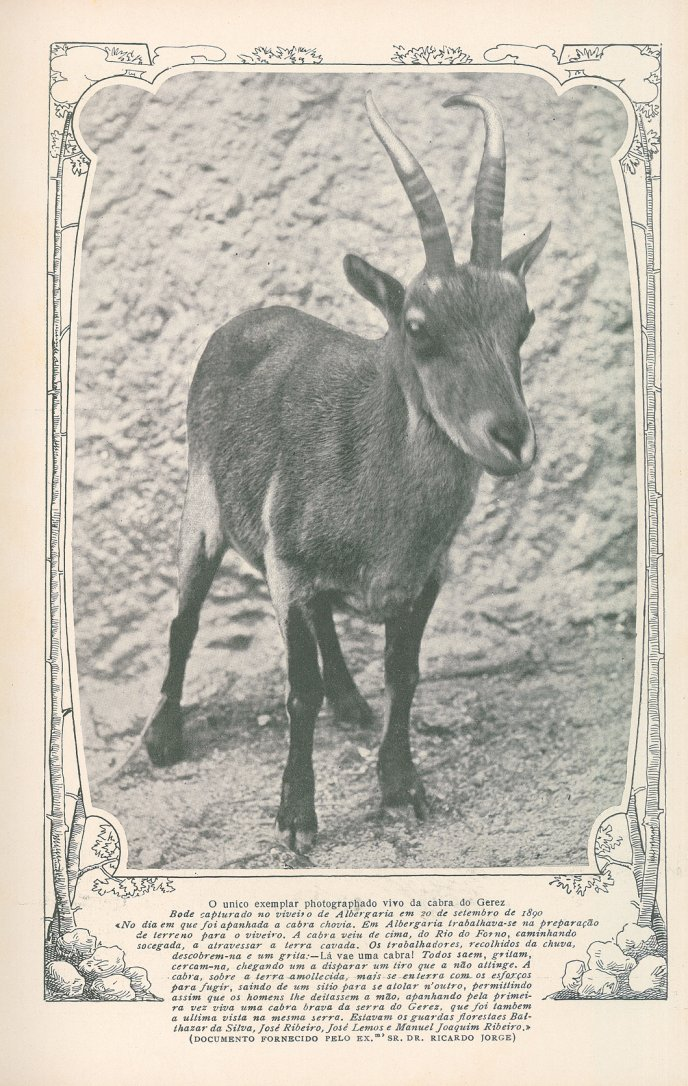
The last and only specimen photographed, captured in Albergaria, 20 September 1890. The caption reads: "The day the goat was caught, it was raining. In Albergaria, work was being done to prepare a site for the nursery. The goat came from above, from Rio do Forno, walking quietly across the dug earth. The workers, sheltered from the rain, discover it and one shouts: ― There goes a goat! Everyone goes out, screams, surrounds her, one comes to fire a shot that does not hit her. The goat, on the softened land, dug itself more with the efforts to escape, leaving one place to take shelter in another, thus allowing men to lay their hands on it, catching for the first time alive a wild goat from the Serra do Gerês, which it was also the last sight in the same mountain range. Present were the forest rangers Baltazar da Silva. José Ribeiro, José Lemos and Manuel Joaquim Ribeiro."

Until 1800, the Portuguese ibex was widespread in its range, but thereafter its decline was rapid as hunting pressure increased. Local hunters did not respect the closed hunting seasons and shot Portuguese ibexes when the herds came down to lower altitudes in May. Local people hunted it for its meat and for the bezoar stones in its stomach which were regarded as potent medicine and antidotes for poisons of all kind. The skins were used as coverlets and the horns both as ornaments and as trumpets of alpine horns to call across the narrow valleys of the north-western mountains.

By 1870, this ibex was a rare animal. The last herd of about a dozen animals was recorded in 1886. An old female was captured alive in September 1889 but survived only for three days. Two more females were found dead next year, victims of a Galician avalanche. The last known Portuguese ibex in Spain died in 1890, and the last known sighting was a female near Lombade Pan in the Serra do Gerês in Portugal in 1892.

Some scientists have pointed to factors other than human interference that may have affected the decline of the Portuguese ibex. Iberian wolves and golden eagles, disease from domestic herds and a disproportionate number of males may have contributed to the rapid population decline. But the last point can be debated since the bucks were a more likely target for hunters and the last recorded sightings were all of females.

Another subspecies, the Gredos ibex Capra pyrenaica victoriae Cabrera, 1911, was introduced in territory formerly occupied by the Portuguese ibex for hunting purposes, such as in Riaño, Province of León; isolated populations of Spanish ibex also exist in Galicia and El Bierzo. Around 2001 ibexes resident in the Parque Natural Baixa Limia-Serra do Xurés in the Galician-Portuguese frontier crossed the border and established themselves in the nearby Portuguese Peneda-Gerês National Park, thus colonizing what had been the last spot inhabited by the Portuguese ibex. Ten years later, the new Portuguese population had increased to about 100 animals.

A Portuguese ibex specimen was on display in the Bocage Museum in Lisbon until a fire destroyed it in 1978.

Cave art of ibexes is present in the Côa Valley in Northeastern Portugal.

== Sources ==
- Almaça, C. 1992. Notes on Capra pyrenaica lusitanica Schlegel, 1872, Mammalia, Paris, 56: 121-124.
- Choffat, P. 1920. Le Bouquetin du Gerez et le Bouquetin de Monte Junto. Bulletin de la Société Portugaise des Sciences Naturelles, Lisbonne, VIII (2) : 151-156. Cabra do Gerês. Capra lusitanica. Geologia. Paleontologia. Ossos de Capra hispanica, não de C. lusitanica.
- Day, D., 1981, The Doomsday Book of Animals, Ebury Press, London.
- França, C. 1908. Descrição da nova espécie, Capra lusitanica França, 1908, in: Le Professeur Barbosa du Bocage - 1823-1907. Bulletin de la Société Portugaise de Sciences Naturelles, II (1-2), pág. 144.
- França, C. 1917. Le bouquetin du Gerez : Capra Lusitanica; notes sur une espèce éteinte / Carlos França IN: Arquivos da Universidade de Lisboa: Lisboa, vol. 4, 1917, p. 19-53. Fauna - Serra do Gerez (Portugal) / Cabra Lusitana .
- Maas, P. 2005. Portuguese Ibex - Capra pyrenaica lusitanica. The Extinction Website.
- Perez, J.M., Granados, J.E., Soriguer, R.C., Fandos, P., Marquez, F.J., and Crampe, J.P. 2002. Distribution, status and conservation problems of the Spanish ibex, Capra pyrenaica (Mammalia: Artiodactyla). Mammal Rev. 32(1):26-39.
