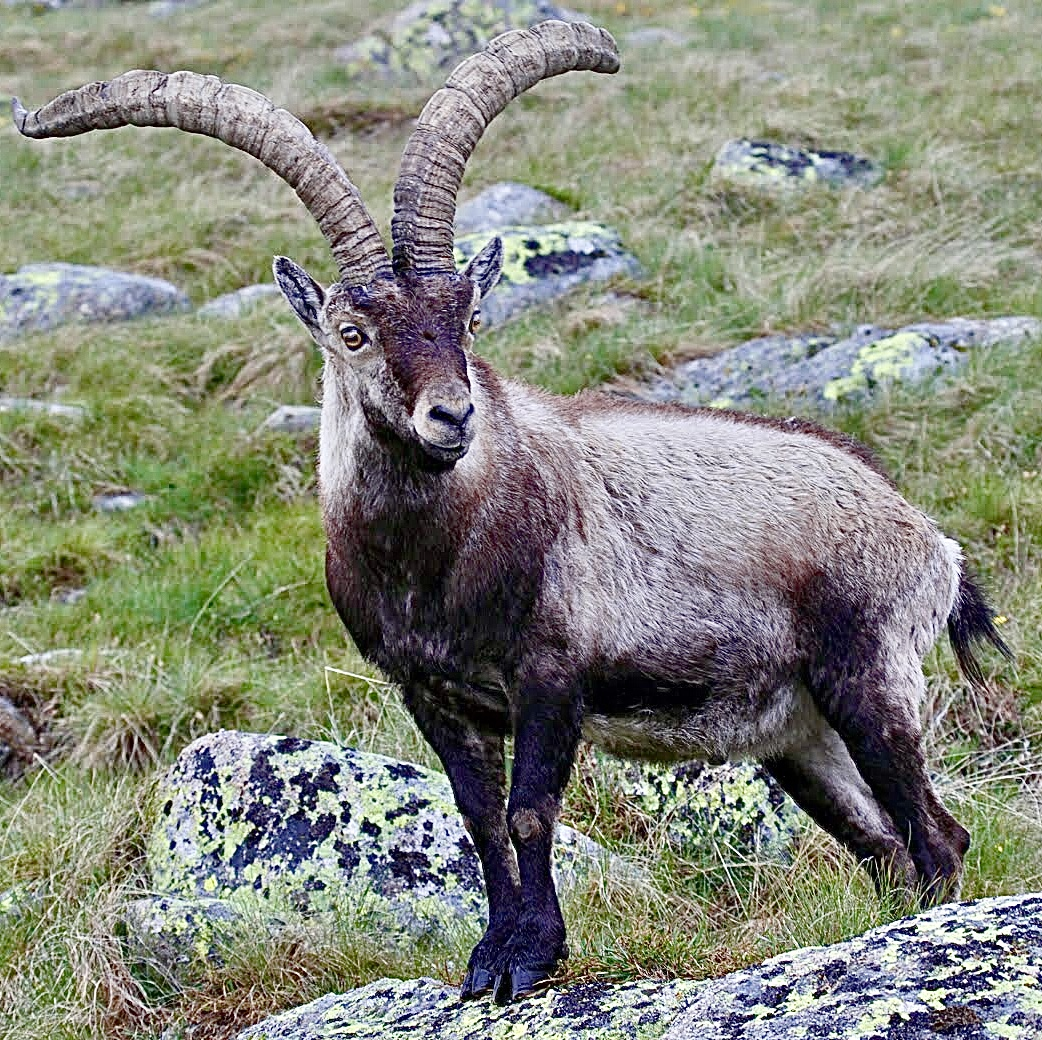
- Male Capra pyrenaica hispanica
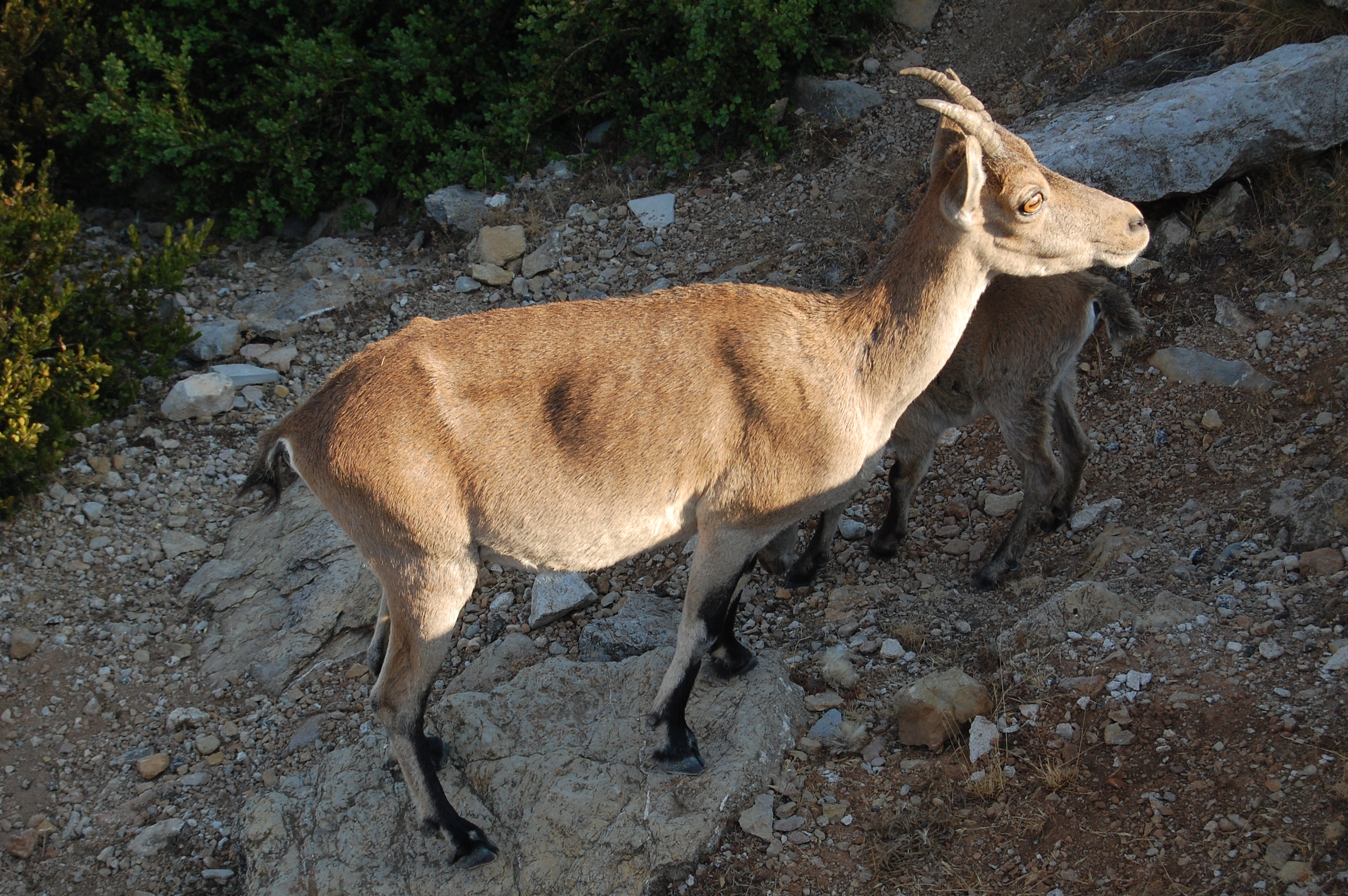
- Female Capra pyrenaica hispanica

Conservation status
- Least Concern (IUCN 3.1)

Scientific classification
- Kingdom: Animalia
- Phylum: Chordata
- Class: Mammalia
- Order: Artiodactyla
- Family: Bovidae
- Subfamily: Caprinae
- Genus: Capra
- Species: C. pyrenaica

Binomial name
- Capra pyrenaica Schinz, 1838

Subspecies
- Capra pyrenaica hispanica Capra pyrenaica victoriae Capra pyrenaica lusitanica †; Capra pyrenaica pyrenaica †
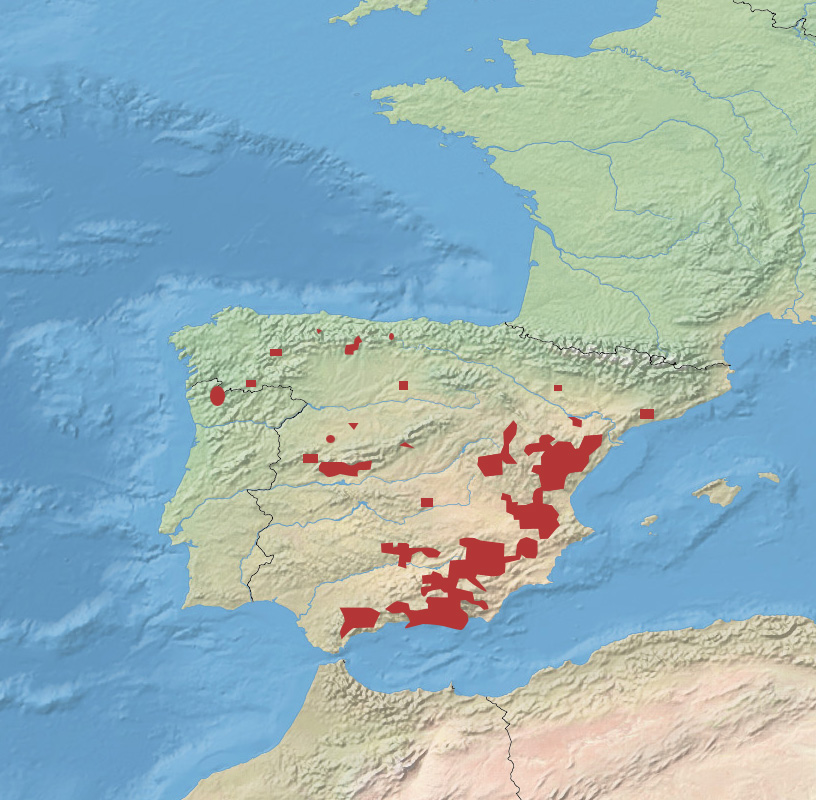
- Distribution of the Iberian ibex (2010, outdated)

= Iberian ibex =

Species of wild goat endemic to the Iberian Peninsula

The Iberian ibex (Capra pyrenaica), also known as the Spanish ibex, Spanish wild goat and Iberian wild goat, is a species of ibex endemic to the Iberian Peninsula. Four subspecies have been described; two are now extinct. The Portuguese ibex became extinct in 1892, and the Pyrenean ibex became extinct in 2000 and in 2003. A project to clone the Pyrenean ibex resulted in one clone being born alive in July 2003, making it the first taxon to become "un-extinct", although the clone died a few minutes after birth due to physical defects in its left lung.

== Subspecies ==
- Southeastern Iberian ibex or Beceite ibex – Capra pyrenaica hispanica Schimper, 1848
- Western Iberian ibex or Gredos ibex – C. p. victoriae Cabrera, 1911
- Portuguese ibex – C. p. lusitanica Schlegel, 1872 (extinct)
- Pyrenean ibex – C. p. pyrenaica Schinz, 1838 (extinct)

== Characteristics ==
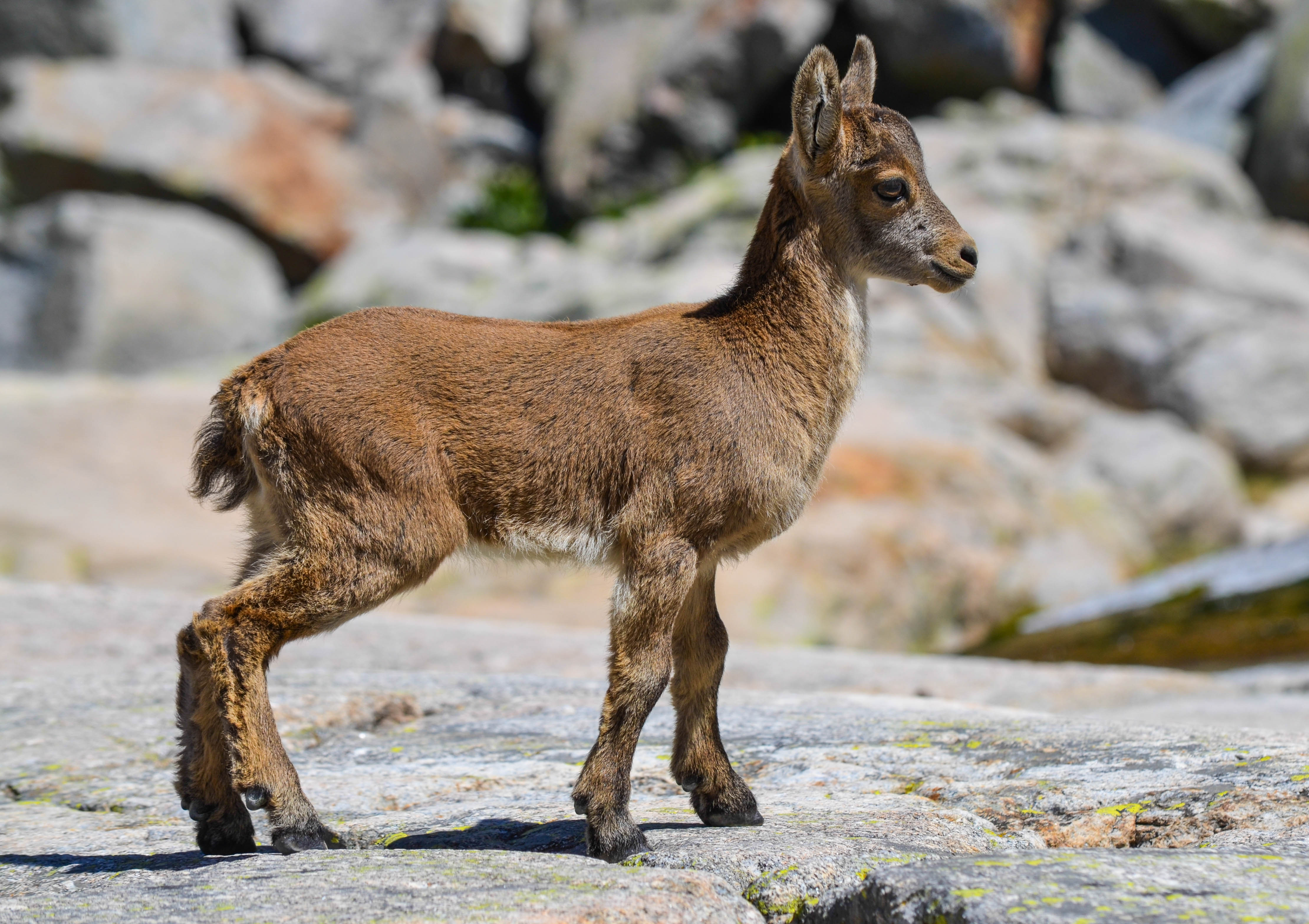
Western Spanish ibex juvenile in Sierra de Gredos, Spain

The Iberian ibex is characterized by its large and flexible hooves and short legs. These physical adaptations allow it to run and leap on bare, rocky, rough and steep slopes out of reach of potential predators. The horns of the Iberian ibex curve out and up and then back, inward, and, depending on subspecies, either up again or down. The annual horn growth is influenced principally by age but can also be contributed by environmental factors and the growth made in the previous year. The Iberian ibex also shows sexual dimorphism, with the male being larger in size and weight and also having larger horns than the female. The bones of the female ibex ossify nearly two years before the bones of the male.

== Distribution and habitat ==
The Iberian ibex populates the Iberian Peninsula and consisted originally of four subspecies. However, with recent extinctions occurring within the last century, only two of the subspecies still exist. Both occur in Spain and in northern Portugal, as well a small reintroduced population in the French Pyrenees. It has been extirpated from Gibraltar and possibly Andorra.

== Behaviour and ecology ==
=== Diet ===
The Iberian ibex is generally a mixed feeder between a browser and a grazer, depending on the plant availability in their home range. Thus, the percentage of each type of resource that is consumed will vary altitudinally, geographically, and seasonally. The ibex also has a special mechanism in the kidney that stores fat in order to be used as energy during the cold winter times. The highest body storage of kidney fat can be found during the productive warm seasons and the lowest during the cold period. The body storage is characterized by the limited food resources. Foraging in ibexes is also different depending on the season. When food resources are low during the winter, ibexes would reduce their rates of movement when foraging. However, during the spring season, when food is more available, they would increase their rate of movement and become more mobile in finding food. This would be the ideal trend of movement since the spring season is more abundant in food resources meaning that there is more competition for food resources forcing some to trek farther in order to obtain food.

=== Reproduction and life cycle ===
Iberian ibex establish two types of social groups: male-only groups and females with young juvenile groups. It is during rutting season (November/December) that the males interact with the females in order to reproduce. Allocation to testes mass was greatest in the rutting season, particularly at ages that are associated with a subordinate status and a coursing, rather than mate-guarding, reproductive strategy. Mixed groups are also common during the rest of the winter. During the birth season, the yearling are separated from the female groups at the time of the new births. The males are the first to separate and return to their male-only groups while the female yearlings eventually return to their mothers and spend their next few years with the group.

=== Predatory response ===
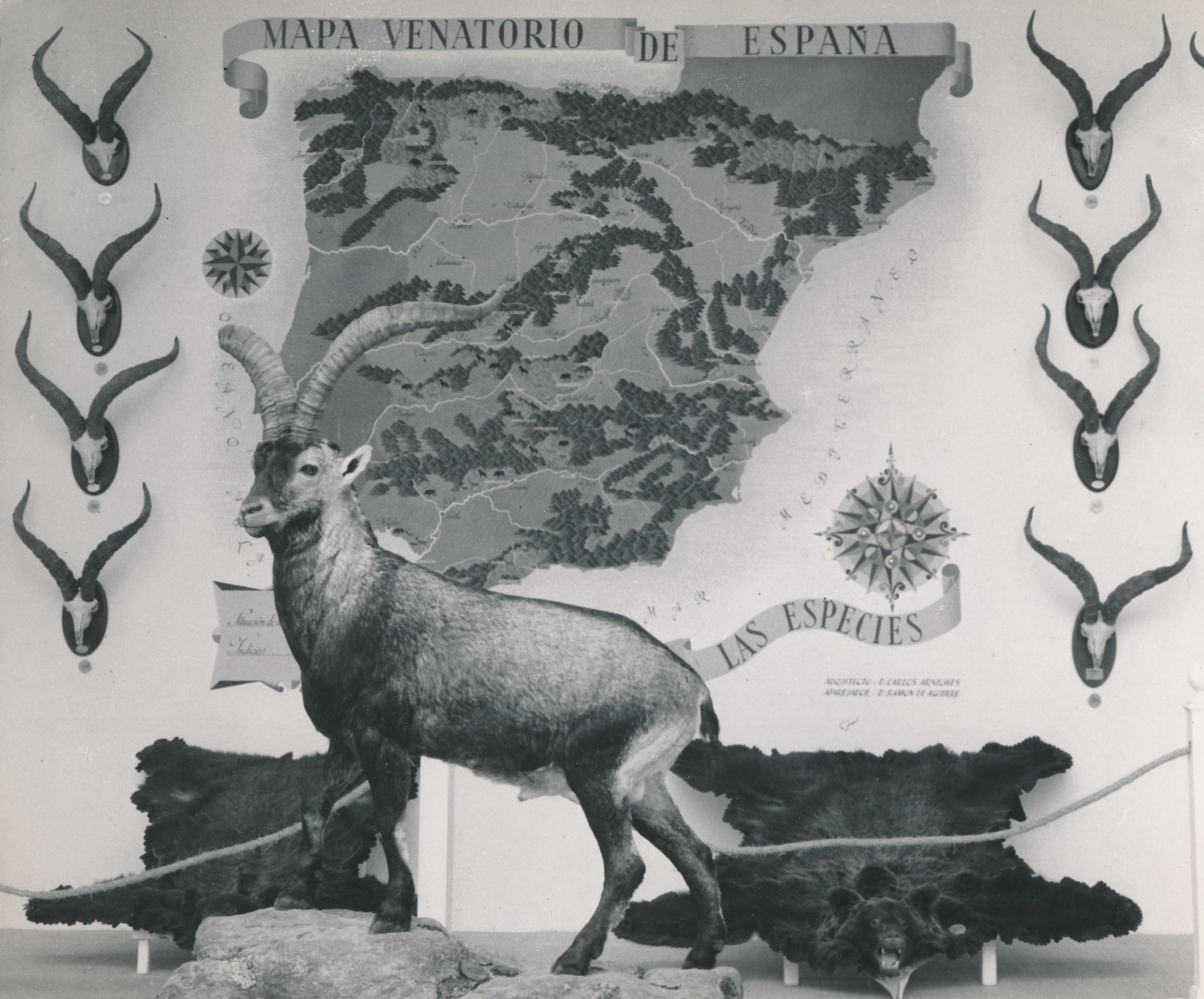
Typical Spanish taxidermy of the different subspecies of the Iberian ibex, 1950

The Iberian ibex has a unique way of signaling others when a potential predator has been spotted. First the ibex will have an erect posture with its ears and head pointing in the direction of the potential predator. The caller will then signal the other ibexes in the group with one or more alarm calls. Once the group has heard the alarm calls, they will flee to another area that is usually an advantageous vantage point like a rocky slope where the predator cannot reach. The ibex usually flees in a very coordinated fashion that is led by an experienced adult female in female-juvenile groups and an experienced male in male-only groups. This possibly allows the group to escape in a more efficient way as the more experienced ibex will know which slope to run to. However, since their alarm calls consists of an abrupt explosive whistle, it can easily be heard by predators and quickly be located even from a distance.

== Conservation ==
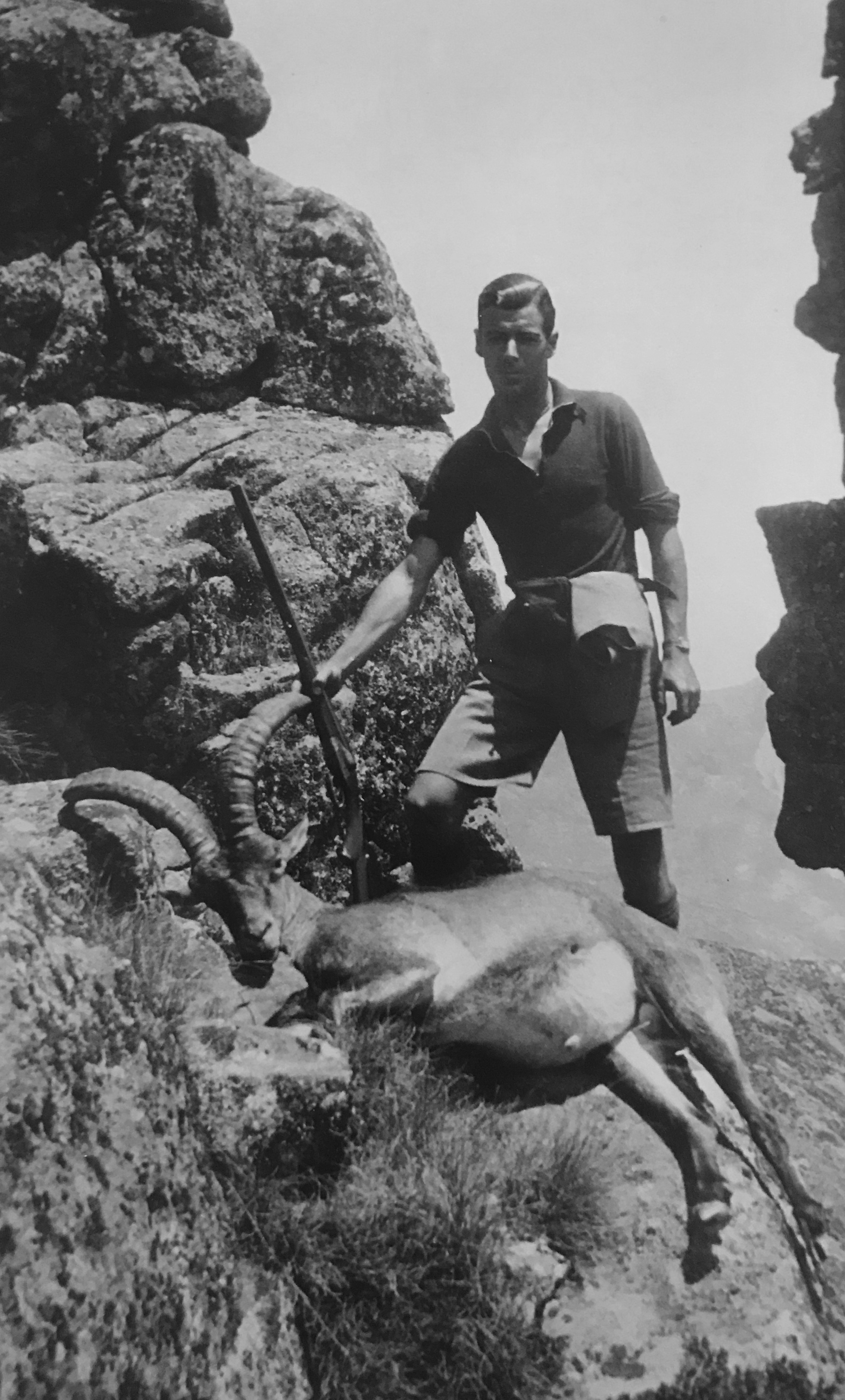
The Count of Teba posing with a killed Iberian ibex of Gredos, photographed by the 11th Marquess of Valdueza, 1950s

The populations of Capra pyrenaica have decreased significantly over the last centuries. This is probably due to a combination of contributing factors such as hunting pressure, agricultural development and habitat deterioration. Around 1890, one of its subspecies, C. pyrenaica lusitanica, also known as the Portuguese ibex, became extinct from its range in the Portuguese Serra do Gerês and Galicia. By the mid-nineteenth century, another of the four subspecies, the Pyrenean ibex, had lost most of its range. It finally became extinct in January 2000, when the last adult female died in the Ordesa National Park. There are also a number of threats to the future preservation of the Iberian ibex such as population overabundance, disease, and potential competition with domestic livestock and other ungulates, along with the negative effects of human disturbance through tourism and hunting.

Recently ibexes from southern Spain have become exposed to disease outbreaks such as sarcoptic mange, the animal version of human scabies. This disease, potentially fatal for infected individuals, unequally affects males and females and it limits the reproductive investment of individuals. The disease has become the main destabilizing factor in many populations of Iberian ibex.
