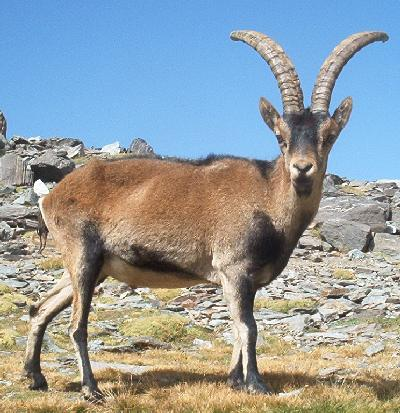
- Southeastern Iberian ibex from Sierra Nevada

Conservation status
- Least Concern (IUCN 3.1)

Scientific classification
- Kingdom: Animalia
- Phylum: Chordata
- Class: Mammalia
- Order: Artiodactyla
- Family: Bovidae
- Subfamily: Caprinae
- Genus: Capra
- Species: C. pyrenaica
- Subspecies: C. p. hispanica

Trinomial name
- Capra pyrenaica hispanica Schimper, 1848

= Southeastern Spanish ibex =

Southeastern Iberian ibex

Subspecies of mammal

The southeastern Spanish ibex (Capra pyrenaica hispanica), or the Spanish ibex, is an ibex that is endemic to Spain and is the only wild caprine native to Spain. It is a subspecies of the Iberian ibex.

The Spanish ibex inhabits the Sierra Nevada, Sierra de las Nieves Natural Park, Sierra de Cazorla, Sierra de Grazalema, Montes de Málaga, in Andalucia. It also occurs in the Sierra Morena. Outside Andalucia, it can be found in the Montes de Toledo and in the mountains all along the Spanish Mediterranean, with populations as far north as southern Catalonia.

This ibex has been observed to consume two native species of columbine, Aquilegia paui and Aquilegia vulgaris, despite the toxicity of members of the genus to some mammals. The efforts to conserve the Spanish ibex were evaluated as possibly endangering the conservation of A. paui, a narrow endemic.

== Gallery ==
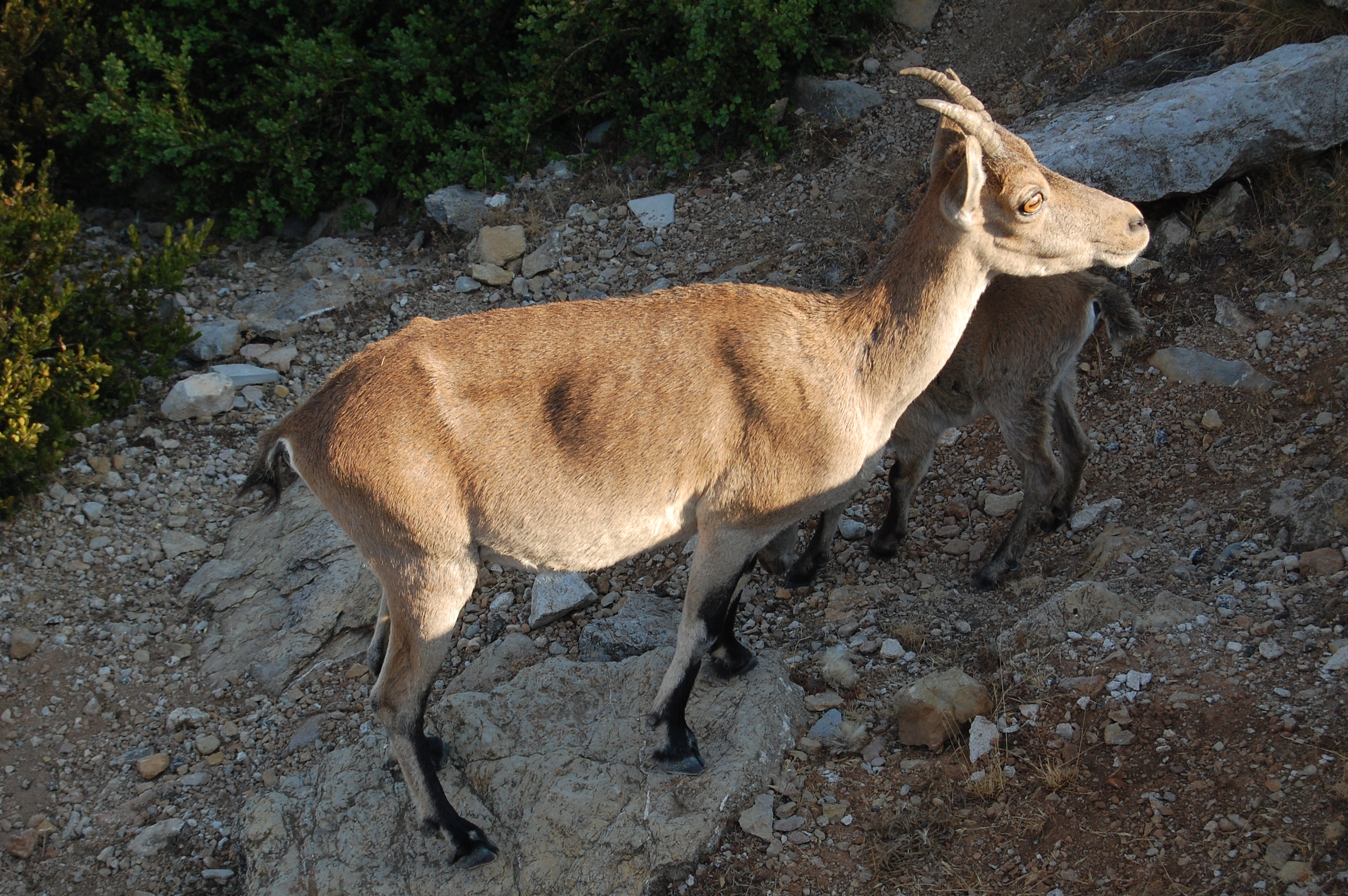
Southeastern Spanish ibex from Mont Caro (Tortosa)
