= Gyulaj Hunting Hungary =

Hungarian state-owned forestry and hunting company

Gyulaj Hunting Hungary Gyulaj Forestry and Hunting, Plc. Gyulaj Erdészeti és Vadászati Zrt.
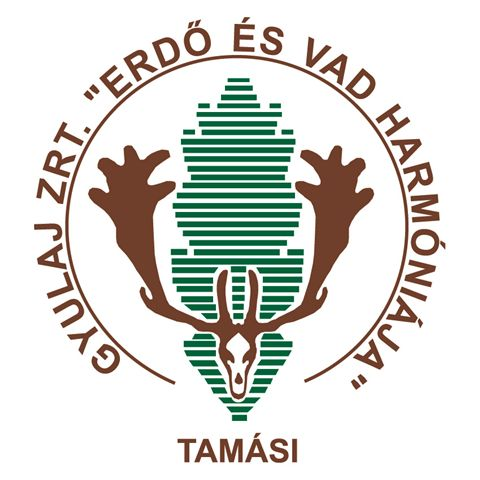
- Type: Private Limited Company (by shares)
- Founded: 1951 (Private Limited Company since November 3, 2005)
- Founder: Republic of Hungary
- Headquarters: Tamási, Tolna county, Hungary
- Area served: Worldwide
- Key people: Péter Gőbölös CEO
- Services: big game management; hunting; forestry & logging; agriculture
- Owner: Ministry of Agriculture of Hungary; Földművelésügyi Minisztérium
- Number of employees: approx. 110
- Website: www.gyulajhuntinghungary.com; www.gyulajzrt.hu

Gyulaj Forestry and Hunting Private Limited Company (Gyulaj Plc for short) is one of Hungary's 22 state owned forestry and hunting companies. Its online marketing brand name is Gyulaj Hunting Hungary. Besides forest management one of its main business activities is big game management carried out in professional and traditional near- nature way. Its game management branch activities include receiving international hunting clients for purpose of hunting for local big game species (red deer, fallow deer, wild boar, roe deer). Its business premises are located in Tamási, South- West Hungary in Tolna County. Among the Hungarian state-owned forestries Gyulaj Plc is the leader by its highest rate of incomings from hunting section (approx. 30%) compared to the total annual incomings of the company. By this performance Gyulaj Forestry and Hunting Plc is a key player of the Hungarian big games management and hunting. Its legal predecessors and different hunting grounds look back at a rich hunting history and performance: a heritage that has been kept alive until today. Gyulaj Forestry and Hunting Plc has been operating in the legal form of a private limited company (by shares) since November 3, 2005. With its center in Tamási it presently does forest management on nearly 23,500 hectares (nearly 60,000 US acres) state forestland and quality game management on nearly 30,000 hectares (nearly 75,000 US acres) in South-West Hungary.

It has three different forestry- offices in Tamási, Hőgyész and Pincehely, in this last case together with a sub-office in Nagydorog. The company has four different game management districts (hunting grounds): in Tamási (called Gyulaj Hunting Ground), Hőgyész (called Hőgyész Hunting Ground), Pincehely and Kistápé (called Pincehely and Németkér Hunting Ground) districts, the hunting areas being between 7,000 and 8,000 hectares (17,000 and 20,000 acres) each. For the time being there are six hunting lodges for catering and lodging purposes: in two lodges at Óbiród (on Gyulaj Hunting Ground), in Kisszékely and Kistápé (on Pincehely and Németkér Hunting Ground) and Csibrák, as well as in Szálláspuszta (both on Hőgyész Hunting Ground). The company is dealing with the management and hunting of three deer species (fallow deer, red deer, roe deer) and wild boar in both closed (fenced areas) and open, free range areas; and with the management and hunting of red deer and roe deer in free range only. 100% of the shares are owned by the Hungarian state, ownership rights are currently managed by the Ministry of Agriculture of Hungary (Földművelésügyi Minisztérium - FM).

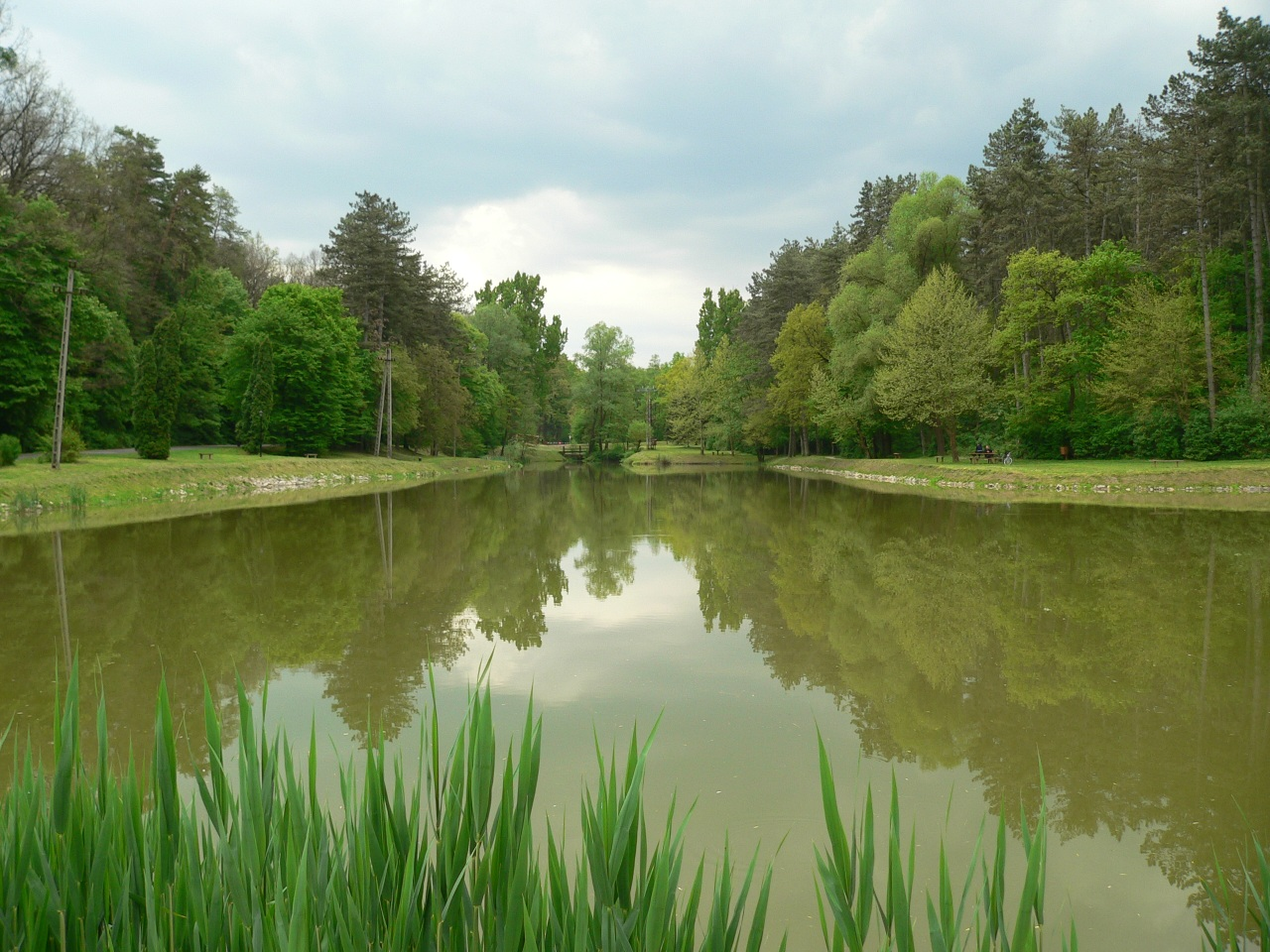
Pond in Tamási Park Forest

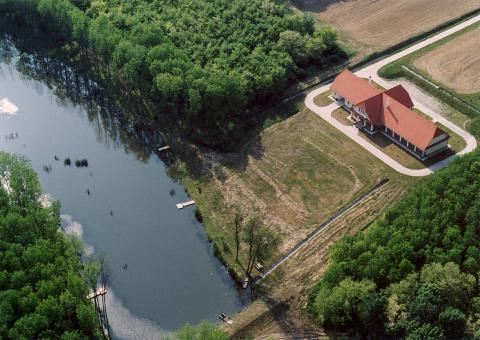
Kisszékely Hunting Lodge from the air

== General information ==
One of Hungary's 22 state owned forestry and hunting companies is Gyulaj Forestry and Hunting Private Limited Company (Gyulaj Plc for short). Its online marketing brand name is Gyulaj Hunting Hungary. Besides forest management one of its main business activities is big game management carried out in professional and traditional near- nature way. Its game management branch activities include receiving international hunting clients for purpose of hunting for local big game species (red deer, fallow deer, wild boar, roe deer). Its business premises are located in Tamási, South- West Hungary in Tolna County. Among the Hungarian state-owned forestries Gyulaj Plc is the leader by its highest rate of incomings from hunting section (approx. 30%) compared to the total annual incomings of the company. By this performance Gyulaj Forestry and Hunting Plc is a key player of the Hungarian big games management and hunting. Its legal predecessors and different hunting grounds look back at a rich hunting history and performance: a heritage that has been kept alive until today. Gyulaj Forestry and Hunting Plc has been operating in the legal form of a private limited company (by shares) since November 3, 2005. With its center in Tamási it presently does forest management on nearly 23,500 hectares (nearly 60,000 US acres) state forestland and quality game management on nearly 30,000 hectares (nearly 75,000 US acres) in South-West Hungary.

It has three different forestry- offices in Tamási, Hőgyész and Pincehely, in this last case together with a sub-office in Nagydorog. The company has four different game management districts (hunting grounds): in Tamási (called Gyulaj Hunting Ground), Hőgyész (called Hőgyész Hunting Ground), Pincehely and Kistápé (called Pincehely and Németkér Hunting Ground) districts, the hunting areas being between 7,000 and 8,000 hectares (17,000 and 20,000 acres) each. For the time being there are six hunting lodges for catering and lodging purposes: in two lodges at Óbiród (on Gyulaj Hunting Ground), in Kisszékely and Kistápé (on Pincehely and Németkér Hunting Ground) and Csibrák, as well as in Szálláspuszta (both on Hőgyész Hunting Ground). The company is dealing with the management and hunting of three deer species (fallow deer, red deer, roe deer) and wild boar in both closed (fenced areas) and open, free range areas; and with the management and hunting of red deer and roe deer in free range only. 100% of the shares are owned by the Hungarian state, ownership rights are currently managed by the 100% state-owned Hungarian Development Bank (Magyar Fejlesztési Bank Zrt.- MFB).

== Four hunting grounds of Gyulaj Hunting Hungary (Gyulaj Plc) ==
The four different hunting grounds provide different landscape and views for hunting clients and different habitats for big game species.

=== Tamási (Gyulaj) Hunting Ground ===
Nearly 8.000 hectares (~20.000 US acres) estate with hilly landscape. The forest coverage is around 80% of the total area. The fallow deer population is excellent, one of the most known populations in Europe. Five International Council for Game and Wildlife Conservation (CIC) world record fallow buck trophies were taken here, a performance still unique in the world. The wild boar population also has excellent features both in quality and quantity. Red deer also can be found in this area but the stags antlers size is smaller compared to the main red deer area, the Hőgyesz Hunting Ground.

=== Hőgyész Hunting Ground ===
Hilly, more than 8.000 hectares (20.000 US acres) area with landscape. Home of trophy red stags and wild boars. The current SCI (Safari Club International) No.1 (World's record) Eurasian wild boar was taken here in 2011 by a US hunting client. The tusk scored 31 9/16 SCI by master measurers achieving the No.1 place on the SCI's rifle ranklist regarding this species. In 2005 season the heaviest red stag antlers (13,80 kg trophy weight) of entire Hungary was also bagged here.

=== Pincehely and Németkér Hunting Ground ===
Various landscape areas with ~14.000 hectares (~35.000 US acres). On Pincehely area the fallow deer population is excellent, each season this area provides trophies over 5 kg trophy weight. The red deer and wild boar population is also significant here. Németkér Hunting Ground is a flat, mainly sandy soil area with pine, poplar and oak tree stand providing good habitat for red deer, wild boar and roe deer. Fallow deer cannot be found here even though the two hunting grounds are relatively close to each other.

== Gyulaj Hunting Hungary (Gyulaj Plc) is in Safari Club International's 2010 Annual Convention in Reno, Nevada, United States ==
Gyulaj Hunting Hungary was part of the Hungarian delegation including the representatives of five different state owned hunting companies as well as the leadership of SCI Central-Hungarian Chapter in introducing the Hungarian state owned hunting grounds in the US market. The Hungarian booth (which included Gyulaj's booth) had a successful trophy exhibition during the Reno show between January 20–23, 2010. In the opening dinner's auction the Hungarian delegation offered a hunting package called the "Hungarian Big Five". This hunting package included the five main trophy big game species of Hungary (red stag, fallow buck, mouflon ram, roe buck and wild boar tusker). The winner was a US hunter from Oregon.

== Specialized hunting equipments for hunters with physical disability ==
In 2011 Gyulaj Hunting Hungary became one of the first Hungarian and Central-European hunting grounds officially providing special hunting opportunities for hunters living with physical disabilities. In this ability project the company built a special track on site designed for wheelchairs. This truck can be used in any weather conditions with wheelchairs to approach a specially designed shooting stand/low seat. Inside the shooting cage even a big size wheelchair and an adult guide can fit providing enough space for shooting and hunting. One of the company's pick up truck was rebuilt for the safe off-road transportation of wheelchairs. A room and its bathroom at the local hunting lodge (Óbiród Hunting Lodge) was also renewed, designed and tested by a local hunter with physical disability.

== History of game keeping and hunting performance ==
=== Hunting Historical Background of Gyulaj Forestry and Hunting Plc ===
Gyulaj Hunting Hungary's hunting reputation is rooted in its hundreds of years of history. The hunting reputation of its estates grew large during the Ozora royal driven hunts in the 18th century. These driven hunts were organized every second year and lasted 2–3 weeks. The local royal family employed more than 12,000 village people to arrange the hunt. After the hunt finished thousands of big game were taken by high-ranking international politicians and members of royal families. The local hunting grounds and region's reputation became even bigger when in 1910 the CIC‘s new measuring system at that time scored and awarded a famous red stag from this county from 1891 the CIC world’s record stag of that era (Szálka stag, Tolna county, Hungary, 1891 - CIC score: 243,90- weight of antlers:11,25 kg number of tines:22 - became world record between 1910-1937). In 1930 a red stag from Gyulaj Plc’s Hőgyész Hunting Ground became also well known by hunting enthusiasts of the world. Its nickname is still the "Hőgyész Hungarian Ox“ (Hőgyész, Tolna county, Hungary, 1930 - weight of antlers:10,60 kg number of tines:16) because of its extremely widespread antlers giving an ox-like looking for the stag. The legendary stag was taken by a noble man. The photo of the stag's head, the hunter and his guide posing next to his automobile travelled around the hunting world in that time. The „Hőgyész Hungarian Ox“ called stag still can be visited in the Hungarian National Museum, Budapest. These trophies were followed by the record fallow buck trophies of Gyulaj Plc predecessors‘ golden era. In 1923, 1965, 1969, 1970 and 1972 five CIC fallow bucks were awarded by the CIC's international trophy awarding commission as the world's record trophies (trophy is able to achieve the No.1 place on the world ranklist). The legendary 1972 Kádár- buck led the CIC fallow buck ranklist for 20 years, which performance is still unique.

Besides the hunting section Gyulaj Plc's bigger part of incomings comes from forest management and wood trading. The main tree stands are Turkey oak, different oak stands, black locust, Scots pine and black walnut with a few beech and hornbeam stands.

=== Bronze Age, Hungarian Conquest and Royal Era ===
All the historical signs and sources refer to the fact that the conquering tribes were amazed watching the game and fish abundance of the Carpathian Basin and South-West Transdanubia. Even before the times of the Hungarian conquest, hunting practice in the forests and fields of the present South-West Hungary were characterized by different hunting methods. Archaeologists assume that besides trap boards, ancient Hungarians used to hunt deer, wild boars, fur-bearing animals from horseback with bows and arrows. 'Anonymous' (Historian of the early Middle Ages) confirmed that Hungarian tribes of the Conquest times applied bows and arrows, and used dogs for hunting. Wild boars stopped by the hunting dogs were stabbed with lances by the royal hunters. Different kinds of hunting dogs can be traced back, too. The first hunting law (1092) restricted the organization of hunts on feast days in the region of the present South-West Hungary. In 1504, Ladislaus II introduced a ban denying villains´ hunting rights for deer, rabbit, wild boar, pheasant and hazel grouse. Later, in the Turkish Ottoman era, the invading forces unboundedly hunted and destroyed the stock of game, thus decreasing it in Tolna region. In the 18th century, after the Turkish occupation, the hunting of the local game stock was regenerated and it operated as a type of protective, preventive action for pest control. At that time, hunting rights belonged to the nobleman who owned the land and later were connected to the land ownership.

=== The Golden Ages of Hunting, Royal Hunts and their Outcome ===
Looking at the ownership relations on the estates of Gyulaj Plc, two significant nobleman family names occur; two dynasties that have dominated the land of Tolna County in the 18-19th century. One of them was the family Apponyi, owning land around Hőgyész (with economic centre in Szálláspuszta where the company has one of its hunting lodges) and Lengyel; the other was the Esterhazy Family ruling over land in Ozora, Tamási and Gyulaj.

Duke Marshal Nikolaus Esterházy first came to hunt in Tamási in 1775. According to some sources, even Archduke Alexander Leopold hunted here together with many other dukes around 1780. The some 300,000 hectare (about 500,000 Hungarian acres) large Esterházy dukedom was established in the times after the Turkish occupation, when King Leopold donated the estate to the family as an act of gratitude for outstanding bravery. The centre of this estate was Ozora. Duke Nikolaus Esterházy was the one who initiated the ´Ozora hunting´ that was to become famous all across Europe. In the years 1777–1779, he had a new hunting castle named ´Miklósvár´ built using the stones of the old Tamási castle – one part of Tamási city still carries this name. The castle with nearly 30 rooms satisfied every need of all the noble guests, whether native or from abroad. These widely renowned and successful hunts had been described in contemporary writings as follows;

...Miklósvár (Tamási) is more well-known in England, in France, and in the lands of our crowned Emperor than any other cities in our country. The reason for this is the presence of a great number of hunt-loving foreign dignitaries with their numerous servants who no doubts disseminate the reputation of Miklósvár everywhere - Count Leó Festetics

In a part of Tamási still called `Vadaskert` (game preserve), two game preserves used to operate. Besides wild boars and small animals, there are deer, red deer and goat, goat that is called fallow deer in these game preserves.

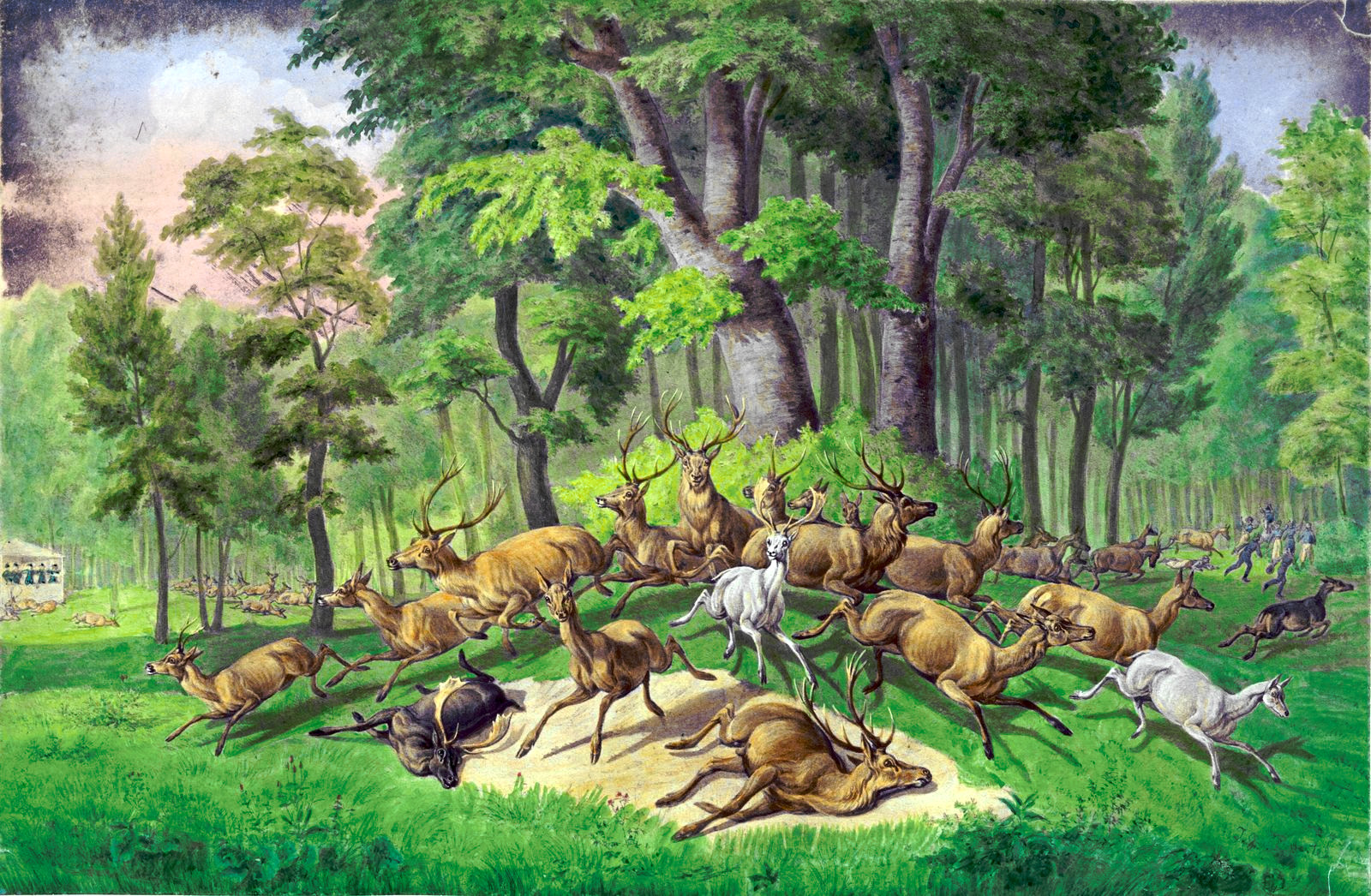
18th century Royal hunts on the Esterhazy estate in Gyulaj area, South-West Hungary

One of the records from the 1820s mentions 1,500 hinds, 800 stags, 600 calves, nearly 3,000 fallow deer and 800 wild boars. Every three years, a legendary and monumental hunt was held that required an astonishing logistic of materials and organization work that were preceded by many weeks’ preliminary arrangements. Both the great number of drivers and the staff handling the killed game was an enormous event region-wide, not to mention the expenses occurred. The transportation of all hunting instruments and equipment such as 7,000 m fence canvas for special hunting methods from the centre (Ozora) to Tamási required a cart pulled by 120 bullocks. The guest list often included famous personalities like the English Lords Anderson and Lord Palmerston, Duke Pazunovszky and to mention only one Hungarian example, Minister Count Zichy. Contemporary reports describe that for a hunt that was to begin on 5 September, the staff had already begun to drive the game on 21 August, ordering every 2–3 days 6,000 bondmen from the nearby villages and more than 200 hunters from the more remote manors. By night fires were lit to make sure that the driven game did not hit the forest again. Another, for this region typical hunting method is the so-called ´high fence hunting´ where a small, bushy territory is enclosed by a 3 m high wooden board fence. The fence had gates in it in order to control the passing of the game. Prior to the hunt, the game was fed in the undergrowth, thus ´lured´ into the enclosed area. Year after years, the schedule of the hunts remained the same: two days high-fence-hunting in Bankó, one day high-fence-hunting in Dalmand, one day in Biród, one day in Kocsola in the enclosed undergrowth and one day in the game and wild boar garden. The game and wild boar garden was to be found on the outskirts of Tamási, an artificially cultivated area enclosed by a massive stone fence where the game was intensely fed by corn for hunting purposes exclusively. Even today, Gyulaj Plc owns property and hunting rights in Bankó, Biród and a great majority of the outskirts of Kocsola village.

My modest work had a mission: to set a humble memorial to one of my country´s lost treasures; so even if the treasure was forever lost, its memory shall be saved from oblivion - Count Leó Festetics

Biród, today called Óbiród (where it operates two hunting lodges), had been a popular holiday resort for numerous distinguished guests and politicians. Gyulaj Plc itself operates two hunting lodges at Óbiród. Each and every hunt began and ended at 6 p.m. with a hunting horn signal. There were many dogs involved in drive hunts, too. An amazing amount of game was moving in front of the beaters in groups of often 300-400 games. Many a game was wounded in course of these hunts. At the end of the hunt, both guests and driving bondmen could take their shares from the enormous amount of game, free of charge. Trophies and the buckskin were transported to the centre in Tamási. The remaining huge quantities of game meat were interred ´with the most possible care´ into deep pits. Such pits were to be found in a collecting point, today known as ´Fleischbank´ (meat bank, meat store). Hunting was a passion in those times. As the duke's stables caught fire in the Fire of Ozora in 1821, the Duke was more shaken by the loss of his linen fence destroyed by the fire than by the loss of his 1,100 horses that died in the stables.

=== World Record Trophies and Hunting Results after the World Wars ===
==== Fallow Buck Trophies ====
The bankruptcy of the Esterházy family had resulted directly in the end of grand-scale hunts that have eventually faded away in history. In the times to come, the legal position of land and thus the practice of hunting rights have changed, descending from lease to lease. The number of game on the territory has varied according to farming and hunting dimensions. However, sources from the years 1925-1926 report a heavy elimination of game as preventive measures to reduce the harm caused by the massive amount of game after the number of big game has expanded on the territory of Tamási forestry. It is remarkable that contemporary sources do not mention wild boar as local game anymore; in fact the wild boar has reappeared in Gyulaj region from the mid-1950s only.

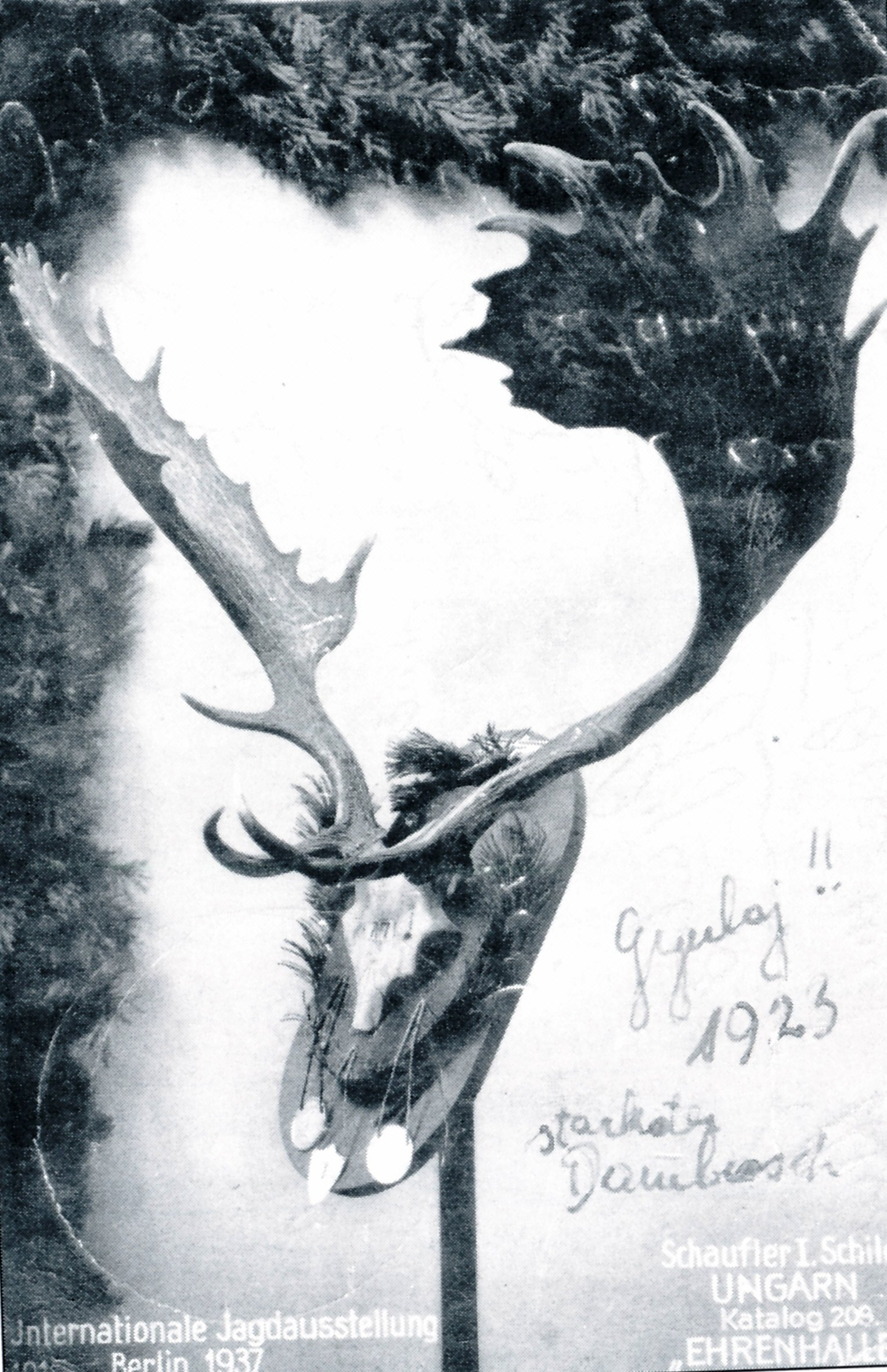
World Record Rimler Buck bagged in 1923, photo of the Berlin international hunting exhibition 1937

===== The Rimler- buck =====
Among the many excellent fallow buck trophies of the era one of the most outstanding is the so-called Rimler stag from 1923 with its 209.26 international points (IP- used by CIC) and its 4.2 kg small/cut skull trophy weight. The buck was wounded during a fight and was about to die. By killing him, Pál Rimler forest councilor and chairman of the legal predecessor forestry, earned the right to receive the game. The trophy that had earned several medals was declared a world record by the jury on the 1937 international hunting exhibition in Berlin, judged upon the CIC judging system as well as the points gained.

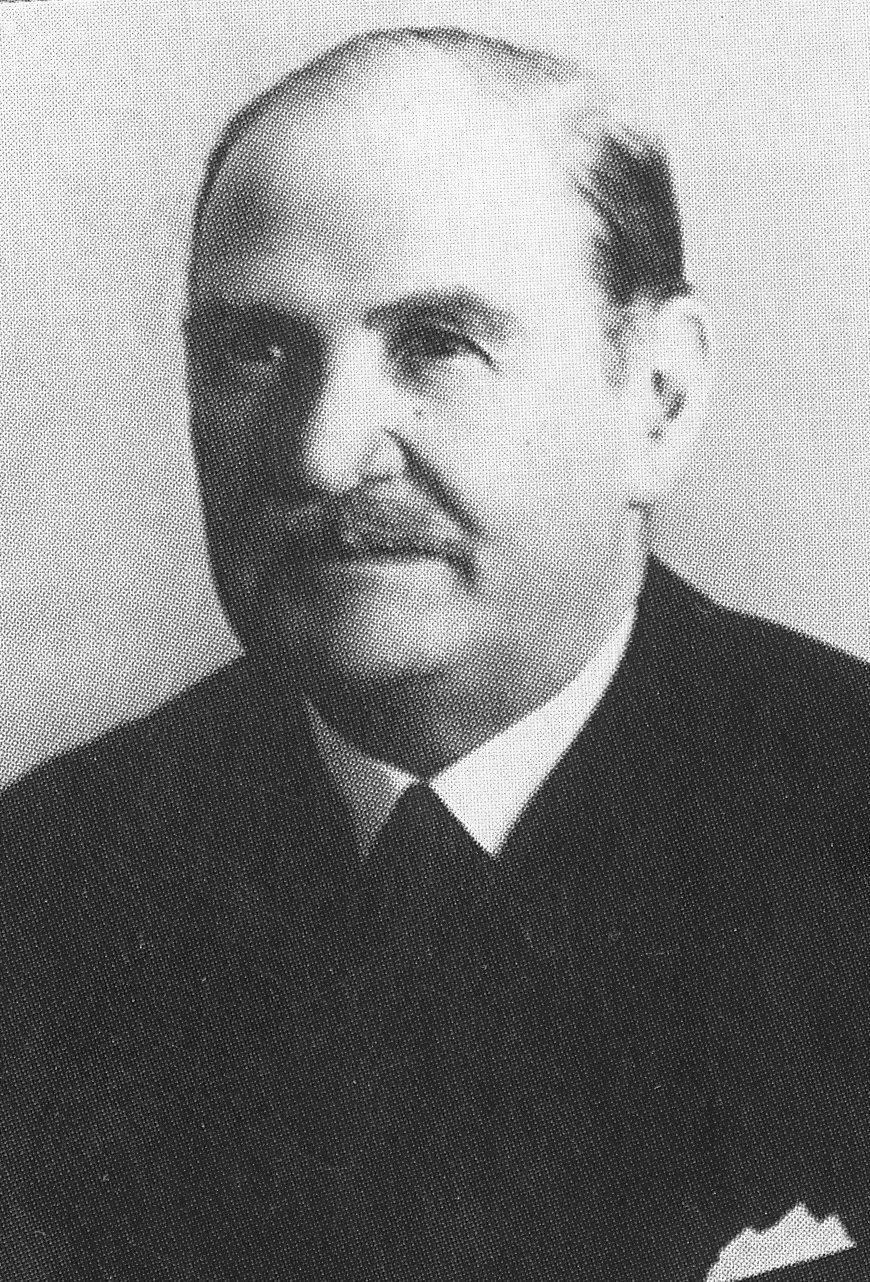
Pál Rimler forest councilor of Gyulaj in the 1920s

The Gyulaj Forestry and Hunting Company founded in 1951 strived to continue the hunting and game management heritage of the past. Its headquarters was established in the old hunting lodge; its administration district covered approximately 10,000 hectares (17,000 Hungarian acres). It was in this time that the forestry gained its status as an official government hunting territory, too. It was managed by a chairman and an administrator, as well as five hunting district guides. Independent from the body of forestry itself, it was the Ministry of Agriculture that had controlled both hunting and game management. Up until the 1970s, the area's excellent stag trophies remained unchallenged; nothing compared to the quality or the quantity of the Gyulaj bucks.

===== The '65 Fehér- buck =====
The new record trophy of this era was shot by the deputy prime minister of that time, Mr. Lajos Fehér. The first Fehér-buck (´65) has qualified as world record on the international exhibition in Novi Sad, Serbia beating numerous excellent trophies in the ranking. The official result was 212.12 CIC points; trophy weigh was 4.30 kg.

===== The '69 Fehér- buck =====
It took merely four years for the next world record to come, and it was again Mr. Lajos Fehér who shot in 1969 the stag that was qualified as world record on the later judgments. The so-called Fehér-buck ´69 reached officially 214.99 IP points; its weight was 3.45 kg. The official judgment of the trophy took place in the grandiose hunting world exhibition held in Budapest in 1971.

===== The Tolnai- buck =====
Ironically in the course of the very same judgment in the Budapest exhibition in 1971, there was one trophy among more than 60 that was shot in Gyulaj region and was suspected to be world recorder, too. This suspicion had soon been confirmed and the trophy of the stag shoot in 1970 broke the Fehér ´69 stag's position with 217.25 IP points – thus the Fehér ´69 stag held its position for a short time only. The trophy of the new world champion stag named after its shooter Mr. Ferenc Tolnai with a considerable weight of 5.15 kg had been qualified by the international jury in Budapest as new world record.

===== The Kádár- buck =====
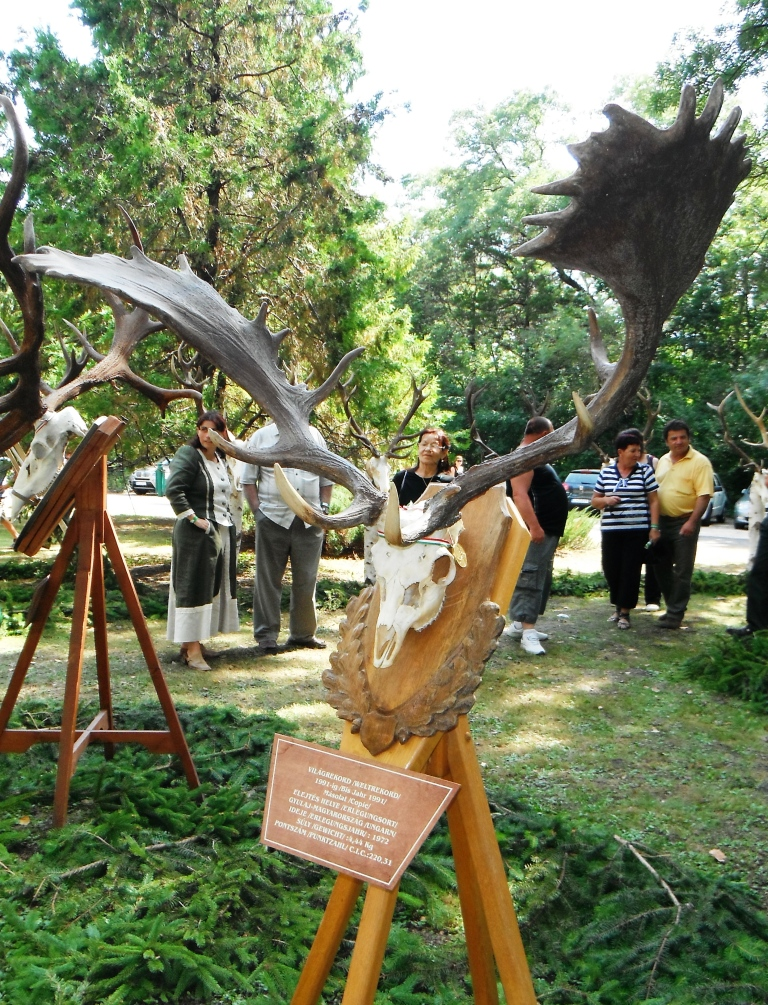
2011 photo of the '72 legendary Kádár- buck from Gyulaj, South- West Hungary. This trophy kept its first place almost for 20 years on the CIC world ranklist

It did not take long to set the next world record. In 1972 János Kádár, the former first secretary of Hungarian Socialist Workers' Party himself, shoot a buck having the most unusual trophy ever existed in Gyulaj. In 1973, the trophy was qualified by an international jury in Turin, Italy for 220.31 CIC points so that a few years later, Gyulaj Forestry presented a new record to the world. The legendary, so-called Kádár- buck with its distinctive stretch and toothed shape had kept its leading position on the international CIC world list throughout nearly 20 years until 1992 – a unique accomplishment in history. The trophy's weight was 4.42 kg.

On the Budapest Hunting World Exhibition in 1971 with 13 participating countries, 15 among 155 stag trophies had reached more than 200.00 IP points: 14 of them were shot in Gyulaj Forestry – a good demonstration of the quality of these stags and their dominant role. By merging Gyulaj Forestry with Tamási Forestry on 1 January 1969, the Gyulaj State Forestry and Hunting Company was being established. One of the most significant episode of the era was enclosing the Gyulaj forest block, meaning almost the entire hunting area, with a nearly 60 km long fence that has been standing there since its completion in 1973. In 1993, the forestry gains the legal status of a joint stock company and continues its outstanding business activities under the name ´GYULAJ´Plc It has been operating as Gyulaj Forestry and Hunting Plc since 2001.

World record fallow buck trophies of Gyulaj Hunting Hungary
Place of hunt	Year of hunt	Trophy weight	CIC score	Hunter
Gyulaj	1923	4,20 kg	209,26 IP	Pál Rimler
Gyulaj	1965	4,30 kg	212,12 IP	Lajos Fehér
Gyulaj	1969	3,45 kg	214,99 IP	Lajos Fehér
Gyulaj	1970	5,15 kg	217,25 IP	Ferenc Tolnai
Gyulaj	1972	4,42 kg	220,31 IP	János Kádár

==== Red Stag Antlers ====
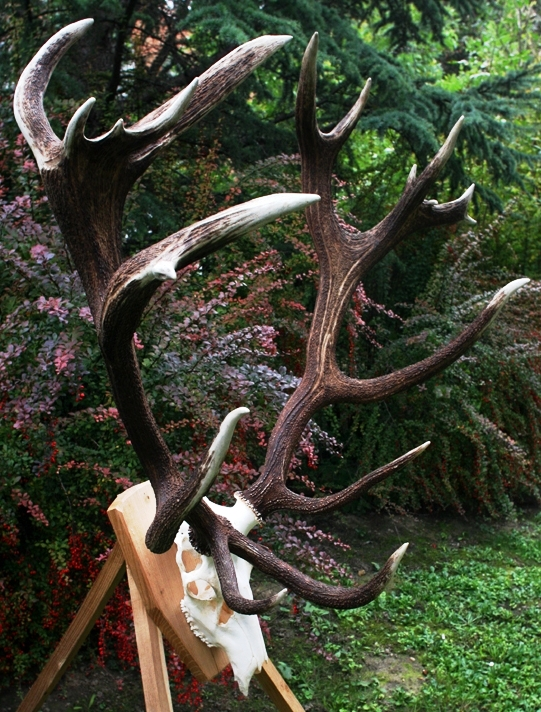
2005 Red stag trophy from Hőgyész Hunting Ground, Gyulaj Hunting Hungary, South-West Hungary. The trophy weight is heavier than 13,50kg

Besides the famous stag trophies of Gyulaj, a great number of red deer trophies had gained qualifications, too. More and more red deer with excellent trophies were shot in Hőgyész, the area of the former Apponyi estate. According to sources, the stock was estimated to be 2,900-3,000 animals already in the time of the Dukedom. Just like in those times, Hőgyész is still considered one of the best hunting areas for red deer and wild boar among professionals. The red deer with the heaviest trophy weight in Hungary was shot in Hőgyész in 2005 – the 13.80 kg trophy reached 239.22 IP points in the official ranking. The best trophy of the red deer season 2010 weighed 13.46 kg and reached 225.85 IP points. The red deer stags in Hőgyész have been proved as being among the best ones of the country for decades. Here are some examples from the past:

Some of the outstanding red deer trophies of Gyulaj Hunting Hungary and its legal predecessor from the hunting area Hőgyész
Place of hunt	Year of hunt	Weight of trophy	CIC Score	Hunter
Hőgyész	1963	9,25 kg	213,48 IP	Eugen Cordt
Csibrák	1979	13,30 kg	241,31 IP	Kurt Lutz
Hőgyész	1981	13,20 kg	239,60 IP	Stefano Rivoirg
Hőgyész	2001	14,30 kg	229,97 IP	Joseph Kress
Hőgyész	2005	13,80 kg	239,22 IP	n.a.
Hőgyész	2010	13,46 kg	225,22 IP	n.a.

Besides Hőgyész the region at Kisszékely is worth to mention, as it had turned out antlers already in 1971 (11.70 kg, hunter: V. Gyenes, 1971 – 230.86 IP). Of course there were further results to come (11.28 kg, hunter: Andreas Flantz, 1999 – 23.49 IP). Also in Kistápé and Németkér, more red deer stags were shot, among them a stag with a more than 11 kg-antler in 2009. Red deer can be found in Gyulaj nowadays, too, however in a smaller number and with a lower antler quality than in the past. Here are a few characteristics of the red deer stags of the past:

Some of the outstanding red stag trophies of Gyulaj Hunting Hungary from the Tamási/Gyulaj hunting area from the past
Place of hunt	Year of hunt	Weight of trophy	CIC Score	-
Gyulaj	1961.	11,05 kg	223,52 IP	Walter Kurt
Gyulaj	1975.	11,55 kg	240,78 IP	Jules Hagedorn

Hunting Ground Pincehely and Németkér: The hunting area covers approximately 20,000 hectares (13,600 Hungarian acres) and holds fallow deer, red deer, roe deer and wild boar. Because of their numbers, roe deer play a significant role in Gyulaj Plc's game management. Wild boar are hunted both in free-range areas and in a 700-hectare game enclosure, which also holds a fallow deer population.

Some outstanding fallow buck trophies by Gyulaj Hunting Hungary from the past years in hunting area Pincehely
Place of hunt	Year of hunt	Weight of trophy
Pincehely	2007	5,27 kg
Pincehely	2007	4,73 kg
Pincehely	2008	4,75 kg
Pincehely	2010	5,05 kg
Pincehely	2011	5,25 kg

Some outstanding red stag trophies of the past years from hunting ground Pincehely
Place of hunt	Year of hunt	Weight of trophy
Pincehely	2007	11,46 kg
Pincehely	2007	10,95 kg
Pincehely	2008	10,30 kg
Pincehely	2010	11,09 kg

Even though it was not shot on the territory of Gyulaj Plc, it should be mentioned that one of Hungary's most famous and first CIC world record stag was shot in the county where Gyulaj Plc has its premises, Tolna county, on the border of the township Szálka. The famous ´Szálka stag´ was shot by the territory's tenant at that time, János Reinspach, in 1891. The unique 22 points antler, with ramifying branches weighed 11.25 kg and qualified with 243.90 points in numerous international rankings as world number one.

==== Wild Boar Tusks ====
The wild boar, as native game in Tolna County, has been present in quantities and qualities in this location. Wild boars with tusks have been harvested in the forests of Gyulaj Plc over time. Documentation from the past describes the qualities of the region's wild boars:

CIC Gold Medalist wild boar tusks in CIC points order
Place of hunt	Year of hunt	Average length of lower tusks	CIC points
Hőgyész	2004	25,50 cm	140,85 IP
Gyulaj	2011	25,35 cm	136,90 IP
Gyulaj	1993	26,60 cm	130,50 IP
Bikács/Kistápé	1992	26,05 cm	125,15 IP
Bikács/Kistápé	1992	20,85 cm	125,05 IP
Hőgyész	1991	21,65 cm	122,70 IP
Hőgyész	1993	19,60 cm	122,70 IP
Gyulaj/Óbiród	1994	21,75 cm	122,35 IP
Gyulaj	1984	24,00 cm	122,30 IP
Gyulaj	1975	22,45 cm	122,05 IP
Gyulaj	1981	21,00 cm	121,90 IP
Gyulaj/Óbiród	2000	22,00 cm	121,05 IP
Nagydorog	1994	19,70 cm	120,70 IP
Kisszékely	1980	19,00 cm	120,50 IP
Gyulaj	1975	21,80 cm	120,20 IP
Gyulaj	1978	19,80 cm	120,20 IP
Bikács/Kistápé	1991	19,30 cm	120,20 IP

===== The Warnock- tusker (the SCI No.1 wild boar tusk from 2011) =====
After the great hunting performance of the 1960s and 1970s, Gyulaj Hunting Hungary broke another world's record in 2012. On an early morning hunt on October 27, 2011, an Oregon hunter bagged a 7-year-old wild boar tusker near to Csibrák village. The first SCI measurement of the tusks surprised both the hunter and the professional staff. The abnormal tusks achieved 31 9/16 SCI score what measurement later was confirmed by a SCI master measurer as well. The boar's one of the upper (so called small) tusks was totally missing and that was the reason why the left side lower (so called longer) tusk could grow with no limit and achieve 43.9 cm length. The right side lower tusk also has an impressive length of 22.7 cm. The trophy officially became SCI No.1 (world's record) in 2012.

=== Wildlife abundance in Tolna County, Hungary ===
Mátyás Bél wrote about the wildlife abundance of Tolna County in the 18th century as follows:

...especially in the precipitous forests, groves and mountains, you will frequently find deer, fallow deer and rabbit. You would not miss lynxes and similar animals, either...

In his study about Tolna County from the beginning of the 19th century, József Moldoványi gave an account on the wildlife abundance in the forests of Tolna County as follows:

...Cheerful and alluring contemplation of the beautiful and great forests initiates the visitors to admire the herds of wild animals in them that seem like village herds from the far, until finally approaching them you can realize that these animals are deer, fallow deer or red deer. Our governor, Duke Esterházy esquire hold widely famous hunting festivals every third year on which he participates with a great number of guests, as well as with many visitors from foreign countries, and this with a good reason, as no other Royal Court in Europe has such abundance of wild animals. According to the notes of the forestry office there were 1,100 animals shot and several wounded by the local and foreign gentlemen during the hunt that took place from 27th August until 1st September in the year 1822. One can imagine how many were wounded and truly, hunters and forest guards are being kept by his Highness for a nice sum of money..

Moldoványi mentions a game garden in Tamási, and so much game in Regöly that "300-400 game was shot during a one-day hunt". A document by Egyed from 1829 describes the region of Nagyszékely as ´full with deer and with other wild animals´. Many village names in South-West Hungary refer to the wildlife abundance of the past.

=== In the old days of poaching on the territories of Gyulaj Plc ===
The abundance of game unavoidably generated the practice of illegal hunting, too. Several sources confirm that poaching was frequent in Tolna County even in those times. János Presser forest ranger at Felsőnána reported to one of the officers of Apponyi estate in 1804:

...according to his duty, going around in the forest he heard a shot, and then another one. He wanted to look into the matter when he saw a man with rifle, but seeing the path he knew this man had to have companions, so he did not approach the poachers but sent a ranger to Nána for help. Four men came to help him and divided into two groups they waited in ambush for catching the poachers who, coming out of the forest, took a doe with calf with them.

János Schwarz, caught as a poacher in 1826, made following testimony:

...I was hunting for big game with my two dogs in the company of forest guard Simon Eisenman first in the obscure valley of Tevel, then in the inner part of the forbidden forest at Hőgyész Csefö on 5th July, when a hunter of Hőgyész Forestry called Nemecz, supported by three other hunters, caught me; I tried to run but could not escape them. My partner slipped away with the dogs. Being caught with my rifle that was filled with chaps, I drove to Hőgyész.

Poachers of those times used to hit the fields by sledge, carriage or boat, thus having an easier approach on the attentive game. Sources confirm that a great deal of poaching happened at the dark of night.
