= Hunting in Romania =

Romania has a long history of hunting and remains a remarkable hunting destination, drawing many hunters because of its large numbers of brown bears, wolves, wild boars, red deer, and chamois. The concentration of brown bears (Ursus arctos) in the Carpathian Mountains of central Romania is largest in the world and contains half of all Europe's population, except Russia.

== History ==
August von Spiess, Director of the Royal Hunts, after a Carpathian bear hunt, 1930s.

Remnants of hunting implements and wild game bones in Stone Age dwellings and burial sites or animal cave paintings like ones in Cuciulat, Peștera cu Oase or Peştera Muierilor indicate the humans have been hunting in Romania for thousands of years. In the Mesolithic age, antlers and animal skulls were used for jewelry and burial sites, and the bow began common and hunt for all game types begun.

The Dacians, ancient inhabitants of present-day Romania, adopted the wolf (Canis lupus) as a symbol and carried wolf heads and skins on poles as totemic battle flags. Ancient Greek and Roman chronicles also mention hunting as an occupation.

The medieval chronicle Descriptio Moldaviae recorded that Moldavia, one of the three historic provinces of Romania, was founded by Prince Dragos in 1351 while hunting. He was chasing an aurochs or a wisent (European bison), who gored and trampled his favorite dog, a bitch named Molda, across his lands of Maramureş. After killing the aurochs, impressed with the riches and beauty of the land, he named it after his dog, brought his people and settled the lands. The aurochs' head remains until today the heraldic symbol of Moldovans.

Beginning in the Middle Ages as a passion or test of manhood, bears, wild boars and sometime stags were killed from close quarters with boar spears after being chased and bayed with dogs. Between the 16th and 18th centuries, Moldova and Wallachia paid part of their tribute to the Ottoman Empire in hunting falcons and wild animal furs, such as ermine and marten. Transylvanian rulers, like George I Rákóczi (1591–1648), were ardent hunters, along with most members of the nobility.

Since the 15th century, hunting reserves were established, where game was managed, monitored and sometimes introduced, such was the case of fallow deer in Romania.

While nobility hunted all range of game and used horses, hounds, weapons and falcons for hunting, the common folk and peasants often hunted only the hare, on foot, relying on spears, slings, maces, pitchforks, throwing axes and snares. The few peasants that lived off hare hunting were known as rabbiteers (iepurari). But poachers (braconieri) illegally hunted all species. Punishments for hunting in royal forest were severe; poachers could be sentenced to death.

Aurochs became extinct after disappearing from Romania in 16th or 17th century. The last wisent hunt took place in 1762 in Moldavia and 1790 in Transylvania, and wisent are now confined to total protection in three of Romania's national parks or reserves after its reintroduction from Poland. Around the same time moose and beavers started to disappear from northern Romania.

When Transylvania was part of Austria-Hungary, it was a popular hunting destination for the Hungarian nobility; some, like the resident lords like Baron Franz Nopcsa and the Teleki, Széchény and Nádasdy families, who owned large estates maintained only for this purpose.

Trophies at the Museum of Hunting, Sibiu

Wolvers (lupari) engaged in old wolf hunting (luparia), seeking the large bounty of money offered per wolf, as these animals caused destruction to livestock. Wolves' fur was also prized as a material for dolmans and winter coats (sube). In 1855, in Transylvania alone, 842 wolf heads were turned in for the recompense.

During the interwar period, shepherds used strychnine to control the wolf population, causing an ecological catastrophe. This technique failed to control the wolf population but did contribute to the extermination of the griffon vultures (Gyps fulvus); the last one was shot in 1929, while flying over the Făgăraş Mountains. The black vulture (Aegypius monachus) was next to disappear.

Until World War I, nobility and gentry indulged in large hunts. In 1901, a party of Count Geza Szecheny killed 28 brown bears in three weeks in Transylvania. Another 22 bears were killed by a parallel hunting party.

Realising that game can only be preserved through protection and education, in 1931, Romania established the world's second-oldest hunting museum, in the Royal Park, Bucharest under King Carol I supervision; unfortunately, in 1940, the museum was destroyed by a large fire. In 1935, by royal decree, the Retezat National Park is created, it was the country's first of its kind.

Once Romania declared its independence in 1877 and the Hohenzollern dynasty was established, hunting became a royal sport; royal hunting châteaus and chalets were created on every hunting domain and people employed were appreciated accordingly. Hohenzollern-dynasty kings were taught from childhood to hunt. King Ferdinand I was a fine hunter; film footage from a 1924 bear hunt of his remains. The Foisor hunting chateau was the king's original summer residence in the Carpathians, before the Peleş Castle was used for royal summer vacations.

In the 19th century, Romania emerged as a major European hunting destination, notably for its Carpathian stag, chamois and bears. Royalty and world's finest or wealthiest hunters came to Romania in pursuit of big game in the Carpathian Mountains. Sir Samuel Baker visited in 1858 to 1859 together with Maharaja Duleep Singh and Frederick Courteney Selous came in 1899. Other visitors included King Edward VII of the United Kingdom, Rudolf, Crown Prince of Austria, King Paul of Greece and even today, kings like Juan Carlos of Spain are amongst the visiting hunters. Colonel August von Spiess chose to remain in Romania, only to become Director of the Royal Hunts under King Ferdinand I of Romania in 1929. Many of the country's most notable writers and poets, including Mihail Sadoveanu, Ionel Teodoreanu, Eugen Jianu, Ionel Pop, Demostene Botez, Octavian Goga, C. Rosetti-Balanescu, I.Al. Bratescu-Voineşti, Nicolae Cristoveanu, were passionate hunters. Some figures, like Mihai Tican Rumano, Dimitrie Ghica-Comăneşti, or Transylvanian-born Hungarian count Sámuel Teleki have undergone extensive safaris and explorations both in Romania and abroad.

World's foremost trophy record book of Rowland Ward mentions Romanian lands as provider of world records for stag (by local and foreign sportsmen), chamois (by Frederick Selous) and Eurasian lynx (by the Prince of Liechtenstein).

Between World War II and the fall of the communism, big game hunting was extremely limited, and permits were granted almost entirely to the Communist Party members, particularly after 1972. The most famous of all was none other than Romanian former dictator Nicolae Ceaușescu. For years, he was dubbed as "country's first hunter", a title he acquired after claiming many trophy animals including world record European brown bear, but the sportsmanship of his methods is subject to debate and generally shunned upon. In total it is estimated that Ceauşescu received a total of 270 gold medals, 114 silver medals and 34 bronze medals according to CIC (Conseil International de la Chasse et de la Conservation du Gibier – International Hunting and Game Conservation Council) for the trophies he presented in exhibit. Many other communist presidents like Todor Zhivkov (Bulgaria) in October 1976 and 1980s, Leonid Brezhnev (USSR) in November 1976, Erich Honecker (East Germany) in February 1977, Nikita Khrushchev (USSR), Gaddafi (Libya) and in particular Josip Broz Tito (Yugoslavia) hunted in Romania at Ceaușescu's invitation and used many of the designated hunting chalets and chateaux domains like Lăpuşna or Scrovistea for big game hunting. Between 1955–1989 it is unofficially estimated that Ceaușescu's hunting parties shot over 4000 brown bears. Starting in 1966, he also introduced mouflons as game animals at Neguresti, Timiş and Scrovistea but the numbers remain very low.

After the fall of the communism, hunting returned to normal and was promoted, and foreign hunters also started to come. The country is now an international destination for sportsmen. One of these was King Juan Carlos of Spain, who in 2004, at Covasna, bagged five bears, two wild boars and a wolf, while football star Roberto Baggio went for rabbit drive hunts in Bărăgan. Furthermore, Romanian former prime minister Adrian Năstase is the chairman of the national hunting association and a spokesman for the rights of hunting. Other politicians and former prime ministers, like Petre Roman, Teodor Meleşcanu and Gheorge Maurer, or artists like Mircea Dinescu, Ludovic Spiess, and Octavian Andronic were also hunters. Romanian-American gymnastics legend Béla Károlyi is also an aficionado, hunting worldwide.

=== Romanians and their hunting traditions ===
Hunting Lodge in Mureș County.

Throughout the 19th and 20th century, the box-lock or open hammers 12 or 16 gauge, side-by-side double shotgun was the most common hunting firearm of all.

Traditionally the hunters and game wardens wear dark green clothing of thick felt, and fedora or trilby hats. More and more, traditional clothes are giving way to modern camouflage, and they may sadly soon be obsolete. Decorative hunting pins are extremely prized for Romanian hunters in their sporting hats, which depending on the wealth or type of hunter can range from a simple fresh branch of fir tree or pine to animal hair brushes or pheasant chest feather fans; the most expensive are usually silver cased badger and boar bristle tufts or capercaillie feather fans.

In Romania, hunting is regarded as a privilege, not a right, and is surrounded by a nostalgic and romantic aura as people pursue it as a noble passion, complete with certain rituals like botez vanatoresc or tablou vanatoresc. Tradition dictates that in big game hunting, in respect for the game and hunt, a tablou (English: image or painting) must be created, where all game is lined up for inspection, cleaned up as much as possible, with small pine branches in their mouths, in a photographic pose and by the hunting master, together with the other hunters and their guns, and photographs are taken as a memory. Less strictly, a tablou is also required if more than two people are hunting rabbit, pheasant or upland game in general. Also, according to tradition, the hunting master asks for forgiveness from the dead animal by kneeling and the successful hunter receives a little branch dipped in the animal's blood as badge of recognition; other rules like never stepping or mounting on a trophy are also part of the ethics. A "hunter's baptism" (botez vanatoresc) is performed for a novice hunter by his fellows when he kills a type of game for the first time; this consists of a mock caning with a branch, lest the hunter ever forget to respect the game or give a purpose to its killing.

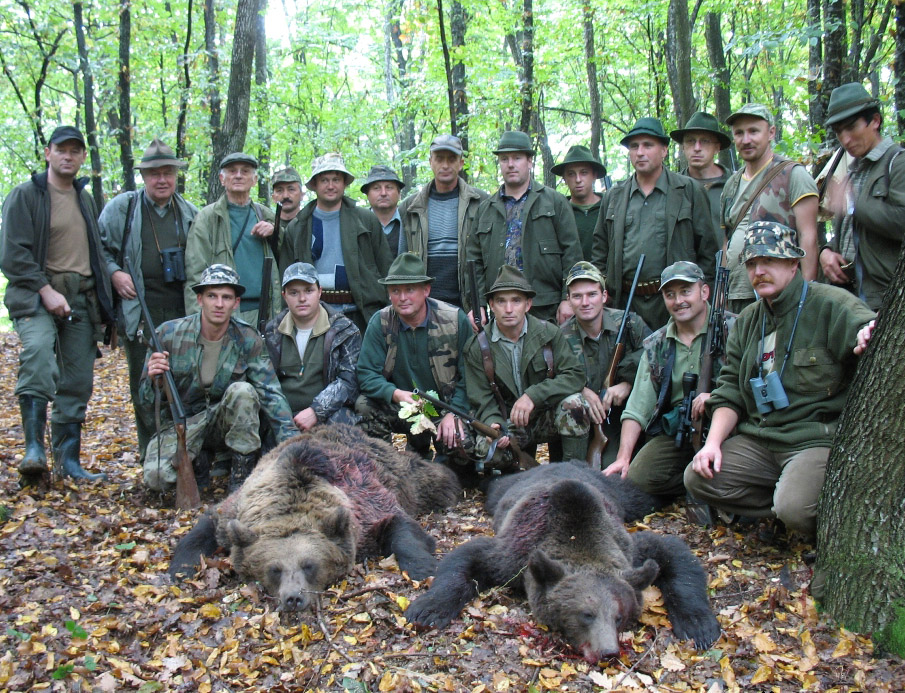
Bear hunting, an informal "tablou" with hunters and their trophies, Romania.

A toast with liquor or wine is given in the honor of the hunt, the game and fellowship of hunters. After the end of ceremonies, lavish meals and partying with folk music is to follow, according to one's wealth and mood. Ethics dictate that one should never shoot a female of anything, unless that is the predetermined quarry, or to shoot an animal while sleeping or drinking. It is forbidden to shoot waterfowl while still on the water.

Over time, Romania has produced a large amount of literature on hunting, including scientific. A good amount of hunting publications, some over a century old, are dedicated solely to wildlife conservation, fishing and hunting. Most famous remains "Vanatorul si Pescarul Sportiv" magazine, a Romanian equivalent of "Field and Stream".

Today, dedicated hunting museums exist, like the small Hunting Museum of Posada (Rom: Muzeul Cinegetic Posada), Prahova, hosting nationally celebrated writer Mihail Sadoveanu's collection. More known is the August von Spiess Museum of Hunting and Hunting Arms, in Sibiu, last one of 1600 pieces, based on collections of Emil Witting (1741–1787), August von Spiess (1841–1923) and the Transylvanian Society of Natural Sciences (Romanian: Societatea Ardeleana de Stiinte Naturale). Another collection of hunting arms is in exhibit at the Peles Castle but valuable pieces are to be encountered throughout the country in regional or natural history museums. Former chateaux and hunting lodges are still preserved and some are open to public, but most have lost their initial purpose.

=== Hunting legislation and agencies ===
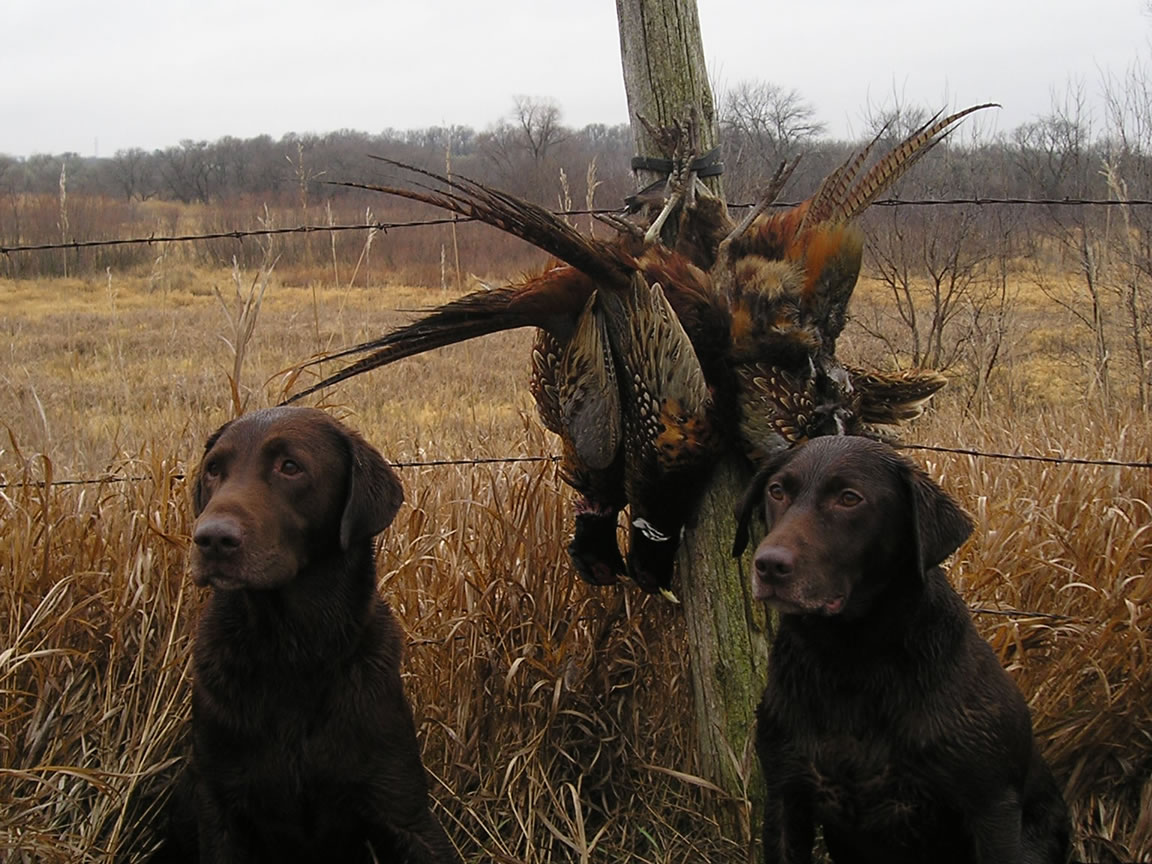
Pheasant roosters are popular game.

All hunting in Romania is legislated by AGVPS, or Asociatia Generala a Vanatorilor si Pescarilor Sportivi (National Association of Sport Hunters and Fishermen). This organization has its roots in the first Romanian hunters association founded around 1880 in Bucharest, and the one in "Hunters Club of Brașov" in 1883, but after the Union of Romania, in 1918 some 30,000 hunters came together in a national organization. Since 1930, Romania is a founder member of CIC (Conseil International de la Chasse et de la Conservation du Gibier – International Council for Game and Wildlife Conservation), and since year 2000, a member of FACE (Federation of Associations for Hunting and Conservation of the EU). AGVPS is active under the jurisdiction of ROMSILVA, or Department of Forestry. They have local clubs (named ocol silvic in Rom.), well organized, in every city or town and regulate hunting seasons and harvest numbers. They are also in charge of enforcing laws against poaching and illegal logging. The common Romanian term for game warden or otherwise any forestry worker is padurar (forester), while the forestry superior officer who must earn a BA diploma and superior education bears the title of inginer silvic (forestry engineer).

Most hunting seasons in Romania for all big game, small game, waterfowl and upland game runs from mid-autumn to late winter. The minimal wild boar and fallow deer rifle caliber in Romania is 6.5×57mm Mauser, while going up to 7×57mm Mauser for red stag and 7×64mm for brown bear. Using shotguns for wild boar is permitted, but forbidden for red stag and brown bear. Currently, all foreign hunters are welcomed to Romania and can hunt all species under out of country tariffs and regulations. Problems like poaching, ethics, and habitat shrinking are subjects of heated debates.

== Big game hunting ==
Big game species include the apex predators brown bear (Ursus arctos), wolf (Canis lupus) and European lynx (Lynx lynx). Species of ungulates include the chamois (Rupicapra rupicapra), red deer (Cervus elaphus), roe deer (Capreolus capreolus), fallow deer (Dama dama), wild boar (Sus scrofa) and mouflon (Ovis aries musimon). Transylvanian Bloodhounds, Fox Terriers and Airedale Terriers are used to hunt wild boar. Hounds are rare and Greyhounds are non-existent in the hunting field in Romania; yet the Transylvanian Bloodhound is a breed of hunting dog developed by the Hungarian ethnics of Transylvania, Romania, centuries ago but internationally registered as a Hungarian breed.

Bear hunting (vanatoare de urs): Romania has the highest number and density of brown bears in Europe and is one of the only few countries to allow its hunting. According to CIC, the world record Eurasian brown bear trophy skin (687.79 CIC points) was shot in Romania in 1985, and for the skull trophy, Romania has 2nd place (69.30 points), while 1st place (70.0 CIC points) was shot in Kamchatka, Russia. Around 250 permits are issued yearly for two bear hunts: fall season (Sep. 15 – Dec. 31) and spring season (Mar. 15 – May 15). Methods used are spot and stalk, waiting, game drives and under special permit, over bait; anything else, like trapping, shooting from blinds or elevated stand or use of archery are illegal. Recommended are large caliber rifle magnums, with a 7×64mm minimum necessary. Good populations are in Gurghiu, Vrancea, Făgăraş and south-east Carpathians. In Romanian hunting tradition, bear baculum is regarded as unconventional trophy.

Chamois hunting (vanatoare de capre negre) in Romania ranks as one of the world's finest, in both specimens' quality and level of challenge. According to the CIC, Romania accounts for the top world record chamois trophy at 141.1 CIC points, shot in Făgăraş in 1937, and unbeaten since, along with other seven of the world's top ten trophies. Capra neagra (black goat) or capra de munte (mountain goat), or how Romanians call these animals, are confined solely to the alpine regions of the south and eastern Carpathian Mountains, living summers above and winters under the timberline. Hunting in such rugged terrain, such wary animal, with very keen senses, makes it very demanding, tiresome and suited only for the fittest and experienced sportsman; chamois hunting is comparable to that of Eurasian ibex or North American mountain goat. The only methods used are stalking and waiting; any use of dogs or drives with beaters are strictly forbidden. The only weapon allowed for hunting chamois is rifle, with a 5.6×50mm caliber coefficient or better. Most successful shots are long range, made from scoped bolt-action or express rifles. A special permit must be obtained by both hunters, foreign or domestic, in order to pursue this animal, in a hunting season of a month or so, opened each year around mid-October.

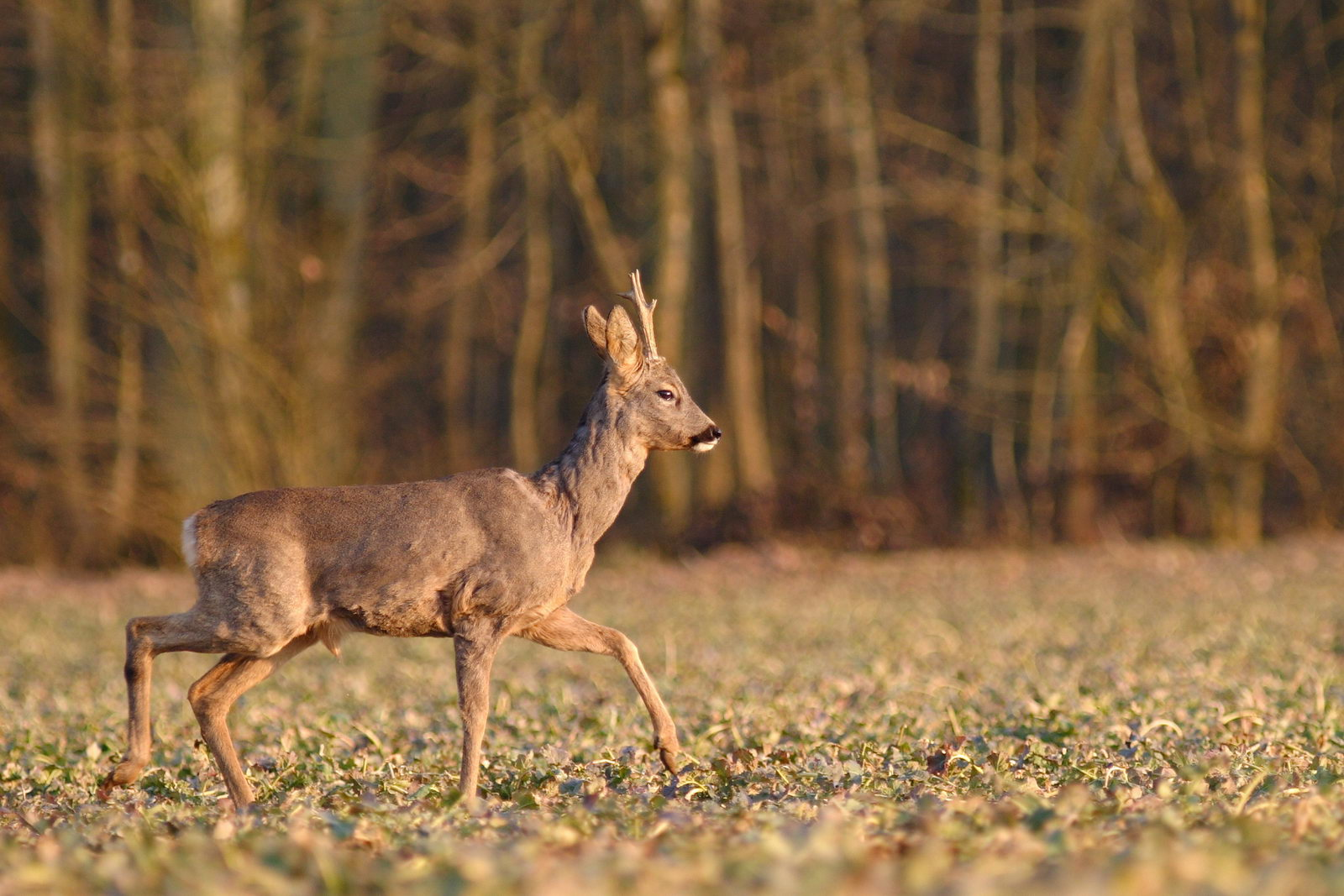
Roe deer is a small type of European deer.

Stag hunting (vanatoare de cerbi) refers to three species cerb carpatin or Carpathian stag (Cervus elaphus hippelaphus), caprior or roe deer (Capreolus capreolus) and cerb lopatar or fallow deer (Dama dama). The most prized remains the red stag (Cerbus elaphus hippelaphus) the largest of the subspecies whom will refer to hitherto. With good numbers, and of fine quality, Romania possessed many times the world record, last of which, between 1981 and 1985, with a trophy of 261.25 CIC, points, taken in Soveja, Vrancea County, in 1980. Current national record is 264.51 CIC points, taken by Ronald Philipp on 22 Sep. 2003 in Valea Gurghiului, Mureș County. Inside hunting preserves, trophies are known to get even bigger, due to controlled feeding and protection. Hunting is done during an open season between 15 Sep. – 15 Dec., with a doe season extending until Feb. 15; methods use are by stalking or by waiting, with or without call (boncanitoare). Harvesting can be legally done only with the rifle, 7 mm caliber minimum, or more. Conventional trophies are the skull with antlers or shoulder mount but unconventionals are skin, the "pearls" (false canines), mane hair and the Hubertus Cross. Places generally accepted as providing best trophies are Valea Gurghiului, Valea Frumoasei.

Wild boar hunting (vanatoarea la mistret) (Sus scrofa) is the most common big game sport in Romania; wild boar is often used for meat as well as for trophies (conventionally the male tusks only, but also shoulder mounts, female tusks, silver hat pins with boar bristles or hair or even skins and rugs).

Hunting season for wild boar opens August 1 and closes February 15, but where considered varmints or pests, they can be shot any time of the year, with AGVPS approval. Methods used are waiting and stalking, but most popular are chase with dogs, usually terriers and scent hounds. Drives, where beaters drive the game to shooters waiting in stands who take shots at the running game, are also popular.

Wild boar drives may include other animals as well, including red deer, roe deer, rabbits, foxes, wolves, and even bears, leading to staggering numbers of game. In his infamous drives, ex-tennis champion and billionaire Ion Țiriac shot, together with his party (including Prince Dimitrie Sturdza, Wolfgang Porsche), each year, on the Balc hunting domain, in Bihor district, 185 boars in 2005, 186 boars in 2006 and a record of 240 wild boars in 2007 in single drive hunts.

National record for wild boar (tusk trophy) is of 144.0 CIC, points. Most boars taken are weighing between 300 and 400 lbs., with sometimes old, solitary males up to 600 lbs.

== Furbearers and small game hunting ==
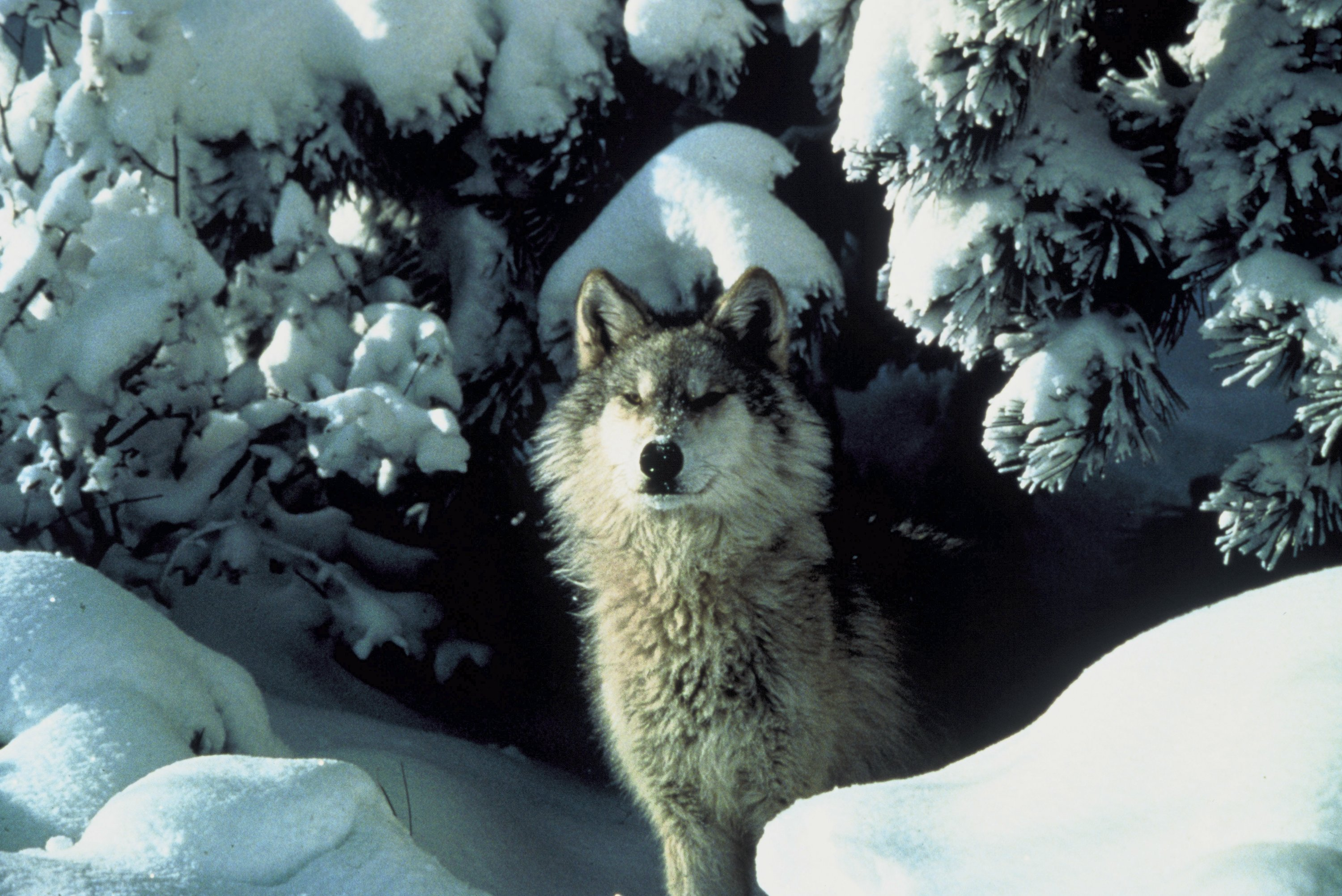
Wolf (Canis lupus) was historically hunted and still exists in large numbers, available even today.

Wolf populations remain strong with an estimated 4000 heads as of 2005, allows wolf hunting (vanatoare de lupi). The season is between September 15 and March 31. Hunters use snow tracking, stalking, calling, and driving with beaters.

Firearms used are shotguns with slug or minimal 5 mm pellet or rifle of 5.6 mm caliber bullet or better. Trophies are considered the skin (rug mount) and skull. Since 1997, Romania has the International Council for Game and Wildlife Conservation (CIC) world record of wolf skin (186.17 points), and a national CIC skull record of 45.30 points.

The red fox, like badgers (Meles meles) are pursued with dogs, such as Dachshunds, Fox Terriers and Jagdterriers, who are used to chase critters even in their burrows. Fox hunting (vanatoarea de vulpe) is also featured in Romanian literature and folk tales, where the cunning of the fox is a common theme.

Small game furbearers are plentiful in Romania and usually hunted with the aid of dogs and snow tracking. Species include European badger (Meles meles), European hare (Lepus europaeus), European pine marten (Martes martes), beech marten (Martes foina), European polecat (Mustela putorius), ermine (Mustela erminea) and weasel (Mustela nivalis). A rare animal is the marmot (Marmota marmota). Otter (Lutra lutra) can be found in the Danube Delta and other marshlands, and is hunted in winter, over iced rivers, at the breathing holes and with dogs, tracking through snow. In the same region, European mink (Mustela lutreola), muskrat (Ondatra zibethica), and raccoon dog (Nyctereutes procyonoides) may be seen.

Rabbit hunting (vanatoarea de iepuri) is among the most common type of hunting. The open season is from November 1 to January 31. Virtually every hunter takes up this sport, using walking and stalking (la picior) with pointer dogs or through drive with beaters (goana). Forbidden techniques are waiting and night hunting. Firearms used are shotguns with pellets size 3–4 mm and rimfire rifles. It is not uncommon to see hundreds of beaters are used during drive hunts for rabbit, or others.

== Bird hunting ==
Popular upland game birds include common pheasant (Phasianus colchicus), grey partridge (Perdix perdix), common quail (Coturnix coturnix), Eurasian collared dove (Streptopelia decaocto), turtle dove (Streptopelia turtur), woodcock (Scolopax rusticola), and starlings (Sturnus sp.). Other hunted birds include hazel grouse (Tetrastes bonnasia), wood pigeon (Columba palumbus), skylark (Alauda arvensis), thrushes (Turdus sp.). Among the most sought-after game birds in Romania is the capercaillie (Tetrao urogallus), a large turkey-like bird, which have a significant presence in the country. It is hunted during mating season, on snow, when the male becomes deaf and blind to all things around him and can be stalked. Beside taxidermy mounts, unconventional capercaillie trophies are the 400-1000 gastroliths, or gizzard stones.

Waterfowl hunting also exists in Romania. Sixteen species of duck are present although only the mallard (Anas platyrhynchos), the common teal (A. crecca) and the garganey (A. querquedula) are commonly encouraged. Two geese species are important as waterfowl game in Romania: The greater white-fronted goose (Anser albifrons) and the greylag goose (A. anser). Other species are hunted, like Eurasian coot and cormorants. Shooting waterfowls with lead pellets is forbidden due to toxicity if ingested by other species.

The carrion crow (Corvus corone) and magpie (Pica pica) are hunted without restriction or season regulations as pests. On the other hand, birds like golden eagle (Aquila chrysaetos) and bustards (Otis tardus) have been hunted to the brink of extinction and are now completely protected.

Common bird dogs are the German Shorthaired Pointer, German Wirehaired Pointer and Setters. Waterfowling retrievers such as the Cocker Spaniels and Labradors are used for waterfowl.

== In cuisine ==
Wild game meat has always been popular with Romanians and Romanian cuisine. A large number of inns, pubs, and restaurants in the country serve menus partially or entirely based on wild game dishes, and specialised chefs are catering to both local and international crowds.

Some popular choices are: wild boar platter (mistret la tava), bear stew with wild mushrooms (tocanita de urs cu ciuperci), wild boar stew (tocanita de mistret), bear paw (laba de urs), venison medallion (medalion de caprioara), venison sausage (carnaciori de caprioara), rabbit with olives (iepure cu masline), ember roasted quail (prepelita la jar) and pheasant soup (supa de fazan). Some of the most famous restaurants serving wild game in Romania are: Cornul Vanatorului (The Hunter's Horn) in Pitești, Burebista Vanatoresc (Hunter Burebista) and Hanul Vanatorului (Hunter's Inn), both in Bucharest and Cabana Vanatoreasca (The Hunting Cabin) in Sinaia. Their dishes do not necessarily come cheap but many are willing to pay the price tag for such, while supply and demand is well balanced.
