= Victor Scherrer =

French industrialist, art collector, and essayist (1943–2022)

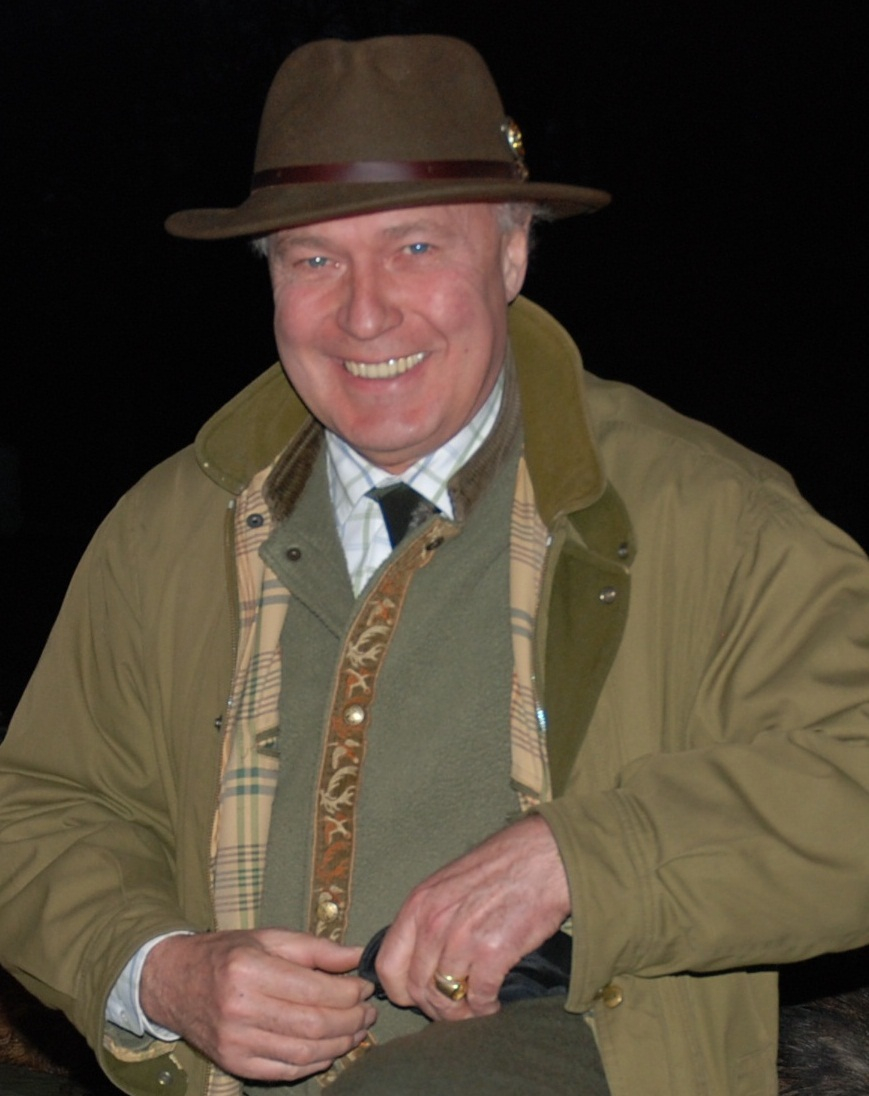
- Scherrer in 2008
- Born: 7 March 1943; Liège, German-occupied Belgium
- Died: 22 December 2022 (aged 79)
- Education: INSEAD
- Occupations: Industrialist; Art collector Essayist

Victor Scherrer (7 March 1943 – 22 December 2022) was a Belgian-born French industrialist, art collector, and essayist.

Scherrer managed several agro-food companies and chaired employers' organizations. He served on the French Economic, Social and Environmental Council from 1994 to 2004 and published the report Réinventer la chasse pour le xxie siècle. In 2009, he was elected president of the French delegation to the International Council for Game and Wildlife Conservation and of the Saint-Hubert club de France in 2010, where he served until 2018.

== Biography ==
Scherrer earned a Master of Business Administration from INSEAD and began his career at UCB in Brussels before becoming a management consultant with McKinsey & Company in Paris in 1971. In 1977, he became CEO of the French subsidiary of Pillsbury, Brossard. He also developed the Green Giant and Häagen-Dazs brands. In 1995, he founded his own brand of organic food products in France, Le Goût de la Vie.

In 1993, Scherrer was elected president of the Association nationale des industries alimentaires, where he served until 2004. During this time, he also chaired the Salon international de l’alimentation. He also directed Heineken France and the French offices of the British companies Sidlaw and Uniq. Later in life, Scherrer chaired the boards of directors of Grandes Sources de Wattwiller and Palonbrus, and directed the company Biscuiterie La Sablésienne.

As an art collector, Scherrer was interested in the art of Soviet dissidents.

Scherrer died on 22 December 2022, at the age of 79.

== Associative career ==
Scherrer was founding president of the Alliance 7, which brought together multiple companies in the food sector. Within the Conseil national du patronat Français, he served on the executive council and was later vice-chairman from 1989 to 2004. As a member of the French Economic, Social and Environmental Council, he submitted two reports: L’industrie agro-alimentaire, force industrielle et chaine de valorisation and Réinventer la Chasse pour le xxie siècle.

Scherrer created the "Les Trophées de l’Esprit Alimentaire", which intended to promote foreigners who particularly favored the French food model. From 2004 to 2009, he was president of the Institut Thomas-More, an independent European think tank. In 2008, he published Chasse et développement durable with the Éditions de Montbel. In January 2009, he became president of the French delegation to the International Council for Game and Wildlife Conservation; From 2010 to 2018, he was president of the Saint-Hubert club de France, succeeding Jacques Chevalier and preceding Henri de Grossouvre.

Scherrer was named an Knight of the Legion of Honour in 1994.
