= Nicolás Franco =

Nicolás Franco may refer to:

- Nicolás Franco (footballer) (born 1996), Argentine footballer
- Nicolás Franco (politician) (1891–1977), Spanish politician
- Nicolás Franco (naturalist) (born 1937), Spanish hunter and naturalist
