= Blood Alone =

Japanese manga series

- Misaki Minato and Kuroe Kurose on the cover of the first volume of the English release of the Blood Alone manga series
- Genre: Supernatural
- Manga
- Written by: Masayuki Takano
- Published by: MediaWorks (former); Kodansha (current)
- English publisher: NA: Infinity Studios (former); Seven Seas Entertainment
- Magazine: Dengeki Daioh; Evening
- Original run: February 2005 – 2014
- Volumes: 10 + 1 dōjinshi
- icon

Blood Alone is a Japanese manga series written by Masayuki Takano, the illustrator of Boogiepop Dual. It was originally published as a dōjinshi. The manga ended abruptly in Spring 2014, however the story was concluded in a dōjinshi.

== Plot ==
Kuroe Kurose is a former vampire hunter, turned private detective and author. He lives in modern-day Yokohama with Misaki Minato, an adolescent girl who has recently been turned into a vampire. Kuroe's investigations often lead him to battle vampires and other undead creatures, sometimes with the support of Higure, a leading figure in the vampire world. Misaki meanwhile struggles to come to terms with her vampire nature and her love for Kuroe.

== Characters ==
Kuroe Kurose
An author, private investigator, and former prolific vampire hunter. He takes care of Misaki and on some quasi-legal basis is her guardian. Unlike most humans, Kuroe is a match against a vampire in combat and has a number of abilities linked to his eyes: he is immune to farumek (a vampire's way of hypnotising humans) and can tell if a someone is a member of the undead posing as a human. This was due to an injury inflicted on his eyes by a vampire who had the Adivuarat Kurai—the Eyes That See the Truth. Kuroe is very affectionate with Misaki but seems unaware of her deeper feelings, often teasing her when she tries to convey them.
Misaki Minato
A young girl, about ten years old, and recently-turned vampire whose human nature is still mainly intact. The daughter of a famous musician and a talented pianist herself, she used to live in a lovely mansion in England while she was human but now lives with Kuroe in a more modest home in Japan. She is in love with him, getting very jealous when he mixes with other women. They even share the same bed (though there is no indication of anything untoward in their relationship). Sayaka once poked fun at Misaki for sleeping in the same bed as Kuroe to which Misaki answered that it was because his bed was so big and comfortable. Kuroe then said that Misaki is still afraid of monsters and ghosts. She is also terrified of thunder. Misaki appears to have a second vampiric personality which wakes up in times of great danger to protect herself, but minimizes the duration of her awakenings as much as possible to preserve the original personality.
Sayaka Sainome
The daughter of a rich doctor (deceased), currently working as head of a police forensics department. She has known Kuroe since they were in school together. She sometimes asks him to assist her in her work, because of his special abilities. She herself has the special ability of "seeing" (walking through) the last memories of the recently deceased. She is familiar with Kuroe and Misaki's situation. She appears to have feelings for Kuroe.
Higure
An elder vampire. He looks like a boy of Misaki's age but is in fact very old and is one of the few "elder generation" vampires in the world. He appears to be immensely powerful, both in terms of physical/vampiric abilities as well as having considerable influence amongst vampires. Higure instructs Misaki on the ways of the vampire and fills Kuroe in with details about them that he was previously unaware of. From his relationships with his male Renfields, Higure is heavily implied to be gay and has even set his sights on Kuroe.
Sly
An underworld figure acquainted with both Kuroe and Misaki, shown in volume 2 to be a vampire. He occasionally brings Kuroe jobs and helps both him and Misaki as an informant. He uses French honorifics (Monsieur, Mademoiselle) and has stated that he hates vampires. Sly's companion is a cat named Larry who has a habit of teasing Misaki.
Maria
A young girl described as a "Renfield", a slave to a vampire. In volume 2 she had been ordered by her "blood parent" to kill her biological father, which Kuroe prevented. Since then she lives with Higure and is just about the only same-age friend that Misaki has. She also has a crush on Kuroe.
Jessie
Kuroe's partner/supervisor while he was hunting vampires in London. She is proficient in hand-to-hand combat and uses knives that can discharge electricity. She has appeared only in flashback so her current whereabouts are unknown, but it is mentioned in chapter 30 that she is still alive. It was she who first put Misaki and Kuroe in touch with one another when an injury in battle prevented her from watching over Misaki who was already the target for vampires. She has an estranged brother named Johnny who met up with Kuroe seeking guidance on romance, as he had fallen in love with a vampire called Sophia who despite her appearance being similar to Misaki's age, is possibly as long lived as Higure.
Chloe
A very powerful sorceress who instructed Kuroe Kurose in how to confront vampires. Her name is also spelled Kuroe in Japanese and there is some indication that the fact that they share the same name is why she and her powers are closely linked to Kuroe. She is even known among the Aruhiek (elder vampires) as "Femme Sinistre" (French for "Sinister Woman", though the manga gives the translation as "the woman with the forbidden name"). Chloe greatly looks down vampires as a whole, deeming as unworthy of fighting seriously against. While Kuroe was operating in London, she appeared to him from time to time to berate him for not using his powers to their full ability. Chloe's magic seems to be revolved around the use of time and reality manipulation, which she has passed onto Kuroe. She later appears before Kuroe, giving him a rather elusive warning of a forthcoming threat. Her relationship with Kuroe has also appeared to turn somewhat more intimate.
The Count
An elder vampire similar to Higure and who lives in the same city. He appears as a blond young man. He looks upon humans as only fit for being Renfields and thus disapproves of Misaki's relationship with Kuroe, which is based more on free will and mutual affection rather than enslavement.
Motoe Kurose
Kuroe's older sister and only known surviving family member. She suffered from an unknown disease and since she was the only woman that Kuroe truly "loved" he would often skip school just to visit her. She disappeared one night in the hospital when a vampire abducted her and blinded the pursuing Kuroe whose eyes gained certain abilities of their own once they had healed. Kuroe believes that his sister is still alive and thus became a vampire hunter in hopes of finding her.

== Aspects of vampires ==
Vampires
Humans become vampires by consuming the blood of a vampire who has previously consumed their own. Vampires are immortal and do not age physically. They can only operate at night. They need to consume blood regularly and must do so to survive when they are injured and lose a lot. They possess fangs that allow them to drink blood from humans, but can also, as Misaki does, drink blood from a glass. Other abilities include increased speed and healing.
Aruhiek (アルハイク, aruhaiku)
A vampire Elder who is a powerful member of the vampire community. In spite of the term, many of them come across as young men: Higure has the body of an adolescent while the Count looks to be in his twenties or early thirties.
Aruta
Special powers possessed by the vampire Elders. The Aruta is different for each Elder: the Count can create multiple copies of himself to confuse his enemies; Higure can tear a victim in two from a distance; and an Aruhiek whom Kuroe and Misaki once confronted in England could turn his arms into huge swords.
Renfields (レンフィールド, renfīrudo)
Named after the servant of Bram Stoker's Count Dracula, a Renfield is a human who acts as a vampire's servant. He or she is a human who has drunken the blood of a vampire and thus possesses partial immortality. However, a Renfield also loses his own will and is thus devoted to his blood parent—the vampire whose blood he drank. The Renfield's feelings and memories are influenced by the blood parent according to the vampire's strength and skill. A Renfield of an Aruhiek can use the Aruta of their blood parent. Renfields are especially useful in doing the work of vampires in the daytime when their masters cannot.
Orphan (オルファン, orufan)
A vampire with no affiliation to a blood clan or parent.
Farumek (ファルメク, farumeku)
A form of hypnosis that allows vampires to bring humans under their control for a short period of time. Farumek has no effect on Renfields who are blood-linked to another vampire. Kuroe, despite being a human, is unaffected by farumek due to his eyes having qualities of Adivuarat Kurai (see below).
Straruda (ストラルーダ, sutorarūda)
An element of a vampire's blood. Each vampire's straruda possesses its own "will" and special properties. If a vampire drinks blood that contains a straruda too powerful for him to handle he runs the risk of turning into a mindless beast. Elder vampires can manage such stradura better, though some aspects of their personality may change.
Absorbire (アブソルビレ, abusorubire)
Vampire cannibalism. A Renfield completely separated from their blood parent can experience intense pain and the only way around that would be to come under the influence of a vampire of the same blood line or one possessing the blood of the Renfield's blood parent. An example of this is when Higure consumes the blood of Maria's original blood parent before killing him, freeing her from his influence and bringing her under Higure's own.
Einseigrad Sparuda (インシグラッド・スパルダ, inshiguraddo suparuda)
The "Red Sword", a guild of vampire assassins.
Vanatoare (ヴァナトーレ, vanatōre)
A vampire killer—from the Romanian term for "hunter" (Romania is the location of Transylvania, home of the most famous vampire of all).
Adivuarat Kurai (アデヴァラート・クライ, adevarāto.kurai)
The "Eyes That See the Truth" are an ability possessed by a certain vampire and his blood clan. The term is also used as if it were the name of that vampire, who was once the head of the Einseigrad Sparuda, and was also responsible for kidnapping Kuroe's sister and turning Misaki into a vampire. He also injured Kuroe's eyes and, once they had healed from the injury, Kuroe obtained certain powers of his own such as recognizing the living undead that pretend to be humans. Misaki also appears to have abilities linked to the Adivuarat Kurai—apparently using it to make Maria realise that her blood parent was an evil manipulator rather than a genuine father figure.

== Volume list ==
No.	Original release date	Original ISBN	English release date	English ISBN
1	February, 2005	484022921X	February 15, 2006	1596972513
2	July 27, 2005	4840231001	August 30, 2006	1596972521
3	June 27, 2006	484023499X	April 25, 2007	159697253X
4	June 27, 2007	978-4840239257	February 6, 2008	1596972548
5	April 28, 2008	978-4048671064	December 2011	978-1-935934-10-3
6	January 27, 2010	978-4048683647	April 2012	978-1-935934-16-5
7	February 23, 2011	978-4063523522		
8	June 22, 2012	978-4063524222		
9	April 23, 2013	978-4063524604		
10	November 22, 2013	978-4063524901		

=== German ===
- Volume 1, April 2007 (ISBN 3551750319)
- Volume 2, May 2007 (ISBN 3551750327)
- Volume 3, September 2007 (ISBN 3551750335)
- Volume 4, June 2008 (ISBN 3551750343)
- Volume 5, June 2009 (ISBN 3551750351)
- Volume 6, February 2011 (ISBN 355175036X)

=== French ===
- Volume 1, July 2006 (ISBN 2915513244, ISBN 978-2-915513-24-0)
- Volume 2, November 2006 (ISBN 2915513368, ISBN 978-2-915513-36-3)
- Volume 3, February 2007 (ISBN 2915513457, ISBN 978-2-915513-45-5)
- Volume 4, October 2007 (ISBN 2915513740, ISBN 978-2-915513-74-5)
- Volume 5, October 2008 (ISBN 978-2355920233)
- Volume 6, June 2010 (ISBN 978-2355921735)

== Drama CD ==
The cover of dramaCD BLOOD ALONE. Kuroe and Misaki

- Drama CD: BLOOD ALONE, July 21, 2006
- Drama CD: BLOOD ALONE II, August 24, 2007
- Drama CD: BLOOD ALONE III, May 25, 2008

=== Main cast ===
- Misaki (ミサキ) (played by Mai Nakahara)
- Kuroe (クロエ) (played by Toshiyuki Morikawa)
- Sainome (サイノメ) (played by Rie Tanaka)
- Slye (スライ) (played by Shinichiro Miki)
- Higure (ヒグレ) (played by Sanae Kobayashi)
