= International Union of Game Biologists =

Non-profit organization

The International Union of Game Biologists (IUGB) is a non-profit organisation with international membership. It has its legal domicile in Cernier, Switzerland. Bylaws were signed in Moscow in 2009.

The organization aims to promote the improvement of knowledge about game biology and related fields of study such as animal population management and habitat conservation. To reach this aim, a conference has taken place every two years since 1954.

== Historical development ==
The first meeting took place at the International Exhibition of Hunting and Game Fishing in Düsseldorf under the supervision of Fritz Nüsslein on October 16 and 17, 1954, at the suggestion of Harry Frank. A free association called "Internationaler Ring der Jagdwissenschaftler" was born. A second 1955 meeting was held in Graz, later congresses every second year. At the suggestion of H. M. Thamdrup it was supervised by a committee, later by the presidents of the old, new, and planned congress. The proceedings of the first and the second meeting were published in the Zeitschrift für Jagdwissenschaft and led to the creation of that journal, which later became the European Journal of Wildlife Research. Since Aarhus, 1957, the congress proceedings have been edited by the organiser of the meeting.

IUGB number	Year	City	Country	Collaboration / Theme	President
39	2029	Brasov	Romania		Ovidiu Ionescu
38	2027	Split	Croatia		Nikica Šprem
37	2025	Lillehammer	Norway	How wild is wildlife? 16th Perdix congress 18th Nordic Congress of Wildlife Research (NKV) Euromammals	Barbara Zimmermann
36	2023	Warsaw	Poland	Kwo wadis wildlife management? The future of wildlife management in the evolving social and environmental realities	Paweł Jackiewicz
35	2021	Budapest	Hungary	Wildlife management in the Anthropocene 15th Perdix congress One with nature: World of hunting and nature exhibition	Sándor Csányi
34	2019	Kaunas	Lithuania	Wildlife: Coexistence or Opposite?	Olgirda Belova
33	2017	Montpellier	France	14th Perdix congress	Nirmala Seon-Massin
32	2015	Puebla	Mexico		Daniel Jiménez
31	2013	Brussels	Belgium	Diversity in Wildlife Management – Objectives & Tools	Yves Lecocq
30	2011	Barcelona	Spain	13th Perdix congress	Manel Puigcerver
29	2009	Moscow	Russia		Vladimir Melnikov
28	2007	Uppsala	Sweden		Kjell Sjöberg
27	2005	Hannover	Germany		Klaus Pohlmeyer
26	2003	Braga	Portugal	10th Perdix congress	
25	2001	Lemesos	Cyprus	9th Perdix congress	Eleftherios Hadjisterkotis
24	1999	Thessaloniki	Greece		Christos Thomaides
	1998	Sopron	Hungary	8th Perdix congress	
23	1997	Lyon	France		Paul Havet
	1995	Dourdon	France	7th Perdix congress: Symposium on Partridges, Quails and Pheasants	
22	1995	Sofia	Bulgaria		Nikola Botev
21	1993	Halifax	Canada		Ian D. Thompson
	1991	Fordingbridge	UK	6th Perdix congress	
20	1991	Gödöllö	Hungary		Sándor Csányi
19	1989	Trondheim	Norway		Svien Myrberget
18	1987	Krakov	Poland		Boguslaw Bobek
17	1985	Brussels	Belgium		C. d'Elzius, Simon A. de Crombrugghe
16	1983	Košice	Czechoslovakia		M. Spenik
	1982			Second meeting of the IUGB Working Group on Game Statistics	
15	1981	Trujillo	Spain	First meeting of the IUGB Working Group on Game Statistics	J. Castroviejo
14	1979	Dublin	Ireland		F. O'Gorman
13	1977	Atlanta, Georgia	USA		Tony J. Peterle
12	1975	Lisbon	Portugal		F. Reiss
11	1973	Stockholm	Sweden		K. Borg
10	1971	Paris	France		F. Vidron
9	1969	Moscow	Russia		B. Bogdanov, A. Bannikov
8	1967	Helsinki	Finland		D. Grenquist
7	1965	Belgrade	Yugoslavia		B. Ticak, S. Valentici
6	1963	Bournemouth	UK		C.L. Coles
5	1961	Bologna	Italy		A. Ghigi
4	1959	Arnhem/Oosterbeek	Netherlands		A. Voute, J.A. Eygenraam
3	1957	Aarhus	Denmark		H.M. Thamdrup
2	1955	Graz	Austria		R. Amon
1	1954	Düsseldorf	Germany		Fritz Nüsslein
