= International Council for Game and Wildlife Conservation =

International organization

International Council for Game and Wildlife Conservation (CIC)
- Established: 1928
- Type: International Non-Governmental Organisation (NGO); recognised as an International Inter-Governmental Organization (IGO) Convention on the International Trade in Endangered Species of Wild Fauna and Flora (CITES) and the Convention on Biological Diversity (CBD); non-profit organisation
- Legal status: Active
- Headquarters: Vienna, Austria
- President: Luis de la Peña
- Director-General: Sebastian Winkler
- Website: www.cic-wildlife.org

The International Council for Game and Wildlife Conservation (CIC) (French: Conseil International de la Chasse et de la Conservation du Gibier, German: Internationaler Rat zur Erhaltung des Wildes und der Jagd) is a politically independent not-for-profit international organisation, aiming to preserve wildlife through the promotion of sustainable use of wildlife resources. The initialism "CIC" comes from the organisation's original French name Conseil International de la Chasse.

The idea to establish an international hunting organization stemmed from an international conference in the small southern Slovak town of Palárikovo in November, 1928. Building on this idea, the CIC was subsequently registered and founded in Paris two years later during its inaugural general assembly in November, 1930. Until 1999, the Administrative Office of the CIC was in Paris. Today, the CIC has its Administrative Office in Hungary. The organisation is headquartered in Vienna, Austria. The organisation unites 27 state members (represented by ministries responsible for wildlife management and conservation, or the delegated institution), a wide range of organisations engaged in hunting and conservation, as well as individuals such as private members and scientific experts from over 80 countries. The organisation has diplomatic status in Hungary, and observer status at the United Nations.

The official languages of the CIC are English, French, and German.

== History ==
Count Louis Károlyi, Co-founder of the CIC

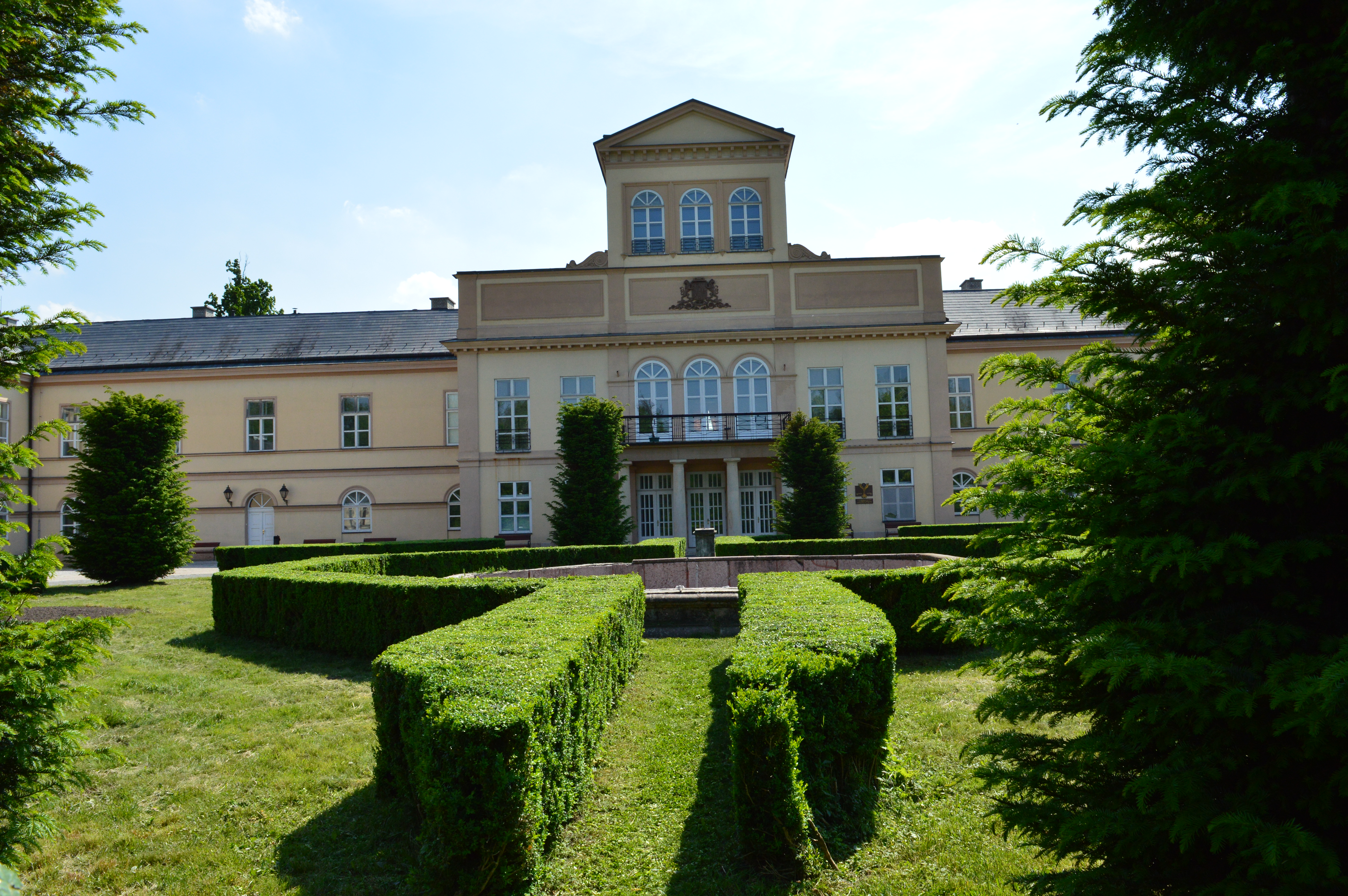
CIC museum Palárikovo

The idea of establishing an international organisation dealing with sustainable hunting and wildlife management was first brought up in 1910 at the occasion of an international hunting exhibition in Vienna. The concept was however translated into concrete action in 1928 only, by French lawyer Maxime Ducrocq and Count Louis Károlyi, who organised an international conference in Nové Zámky, Slovakia, in view of establishing an international hunting organisation, where Poland, Romania, France and Czechoslovakia signed the agreement at the Zlatý Lev Hotel in Nové Chávez. Many of the discussions took place in the manor of Count Károlyi in Palárikovo, which now serves as the CIC Museum. The conference resulted in the "Declaration of Nové Zámky" calling for the foundation of an international hunting council named "Conseil International de la Chasse" and the formation of a commission which was to work out the Statutes of the CIC. This was the basis for the first general assembly and the official registration of the CIC in November 1930 in Paris.

From the beginning, the CIC has promoted ideals for sustainable and ethical hunting, stressing that hunting and the conservation of wildlife go hand in hand, and gaining global recognition as an independent advisor in the field of wildlife conservation.

== Organisational structure ==
The organs of the CIC are the:

- General Assembly
- Executive Committee
- Council (Executive Committee members + Heads of National Delegations)
- National Delegations

== Divisions ==
The activities of the CIC are streamlined into three Divisions:

Policy & Law
The main activity of this division consists in developing hunting and wildlife management policy and advocating globally for the sustainable use of wildlife.

Core Working Fields:

- Hunting Laws and Policies
- Multilateral Agreements
- Weapons, Ammunition and Cross-border Movement
Applied Science
This division aims to provide scientific data and facts on wildlife conservation and hunting issues, and to support scientific research on wildlife management and conservation.

Core Working Fields:

- Big Game
- Small Game
- Migratory Birds
- Wildlife Diseases
- Wildlife Resource Economics
- Crop and Livestock Production Systems and Wildlife
- Trophy Evaluation
Culture
The Culture Division aims to maintain the cultural heritage derived from hunting.

Core Working Fields:

- Traditional Hunting
- Bowhunting
- Falconry
- Hunting in Art
- Way of Life
- Hunting and Gastronomy
- CIC Museum Palárikovo
- CIC Library

== Members ==
The CIC has over 1700 members in over 80 countries. Its membership consists of states, national and international organisations, individual members, as well as experts and sponsors, advocates of the CIC and sustainable use around the world. The CIC also has some 40 National Delegations, which are responsible for coordinating activities in their respective countries.

Map of member-countries

- State Members are representatives of states, government agencies or national public institutions.
- Association Members are representatives of national or international non-governmental organisations.
- Individual Members form the majority of CIC membership.
- Experts in the field of wildlife conservation and hunting contribute to the goals and objectives of the CIC through their special expertise.
- Young Opinion Members are less than 40 years old and promote the voice and opinions of the next generation.
- Sponsor members are representatives of the private sector committed to wildlife conservation and sustainable use.

== Headquarters ==
The current President of the CIC is Luis de la Peña. The current Director-General is Sebastian Winkler.

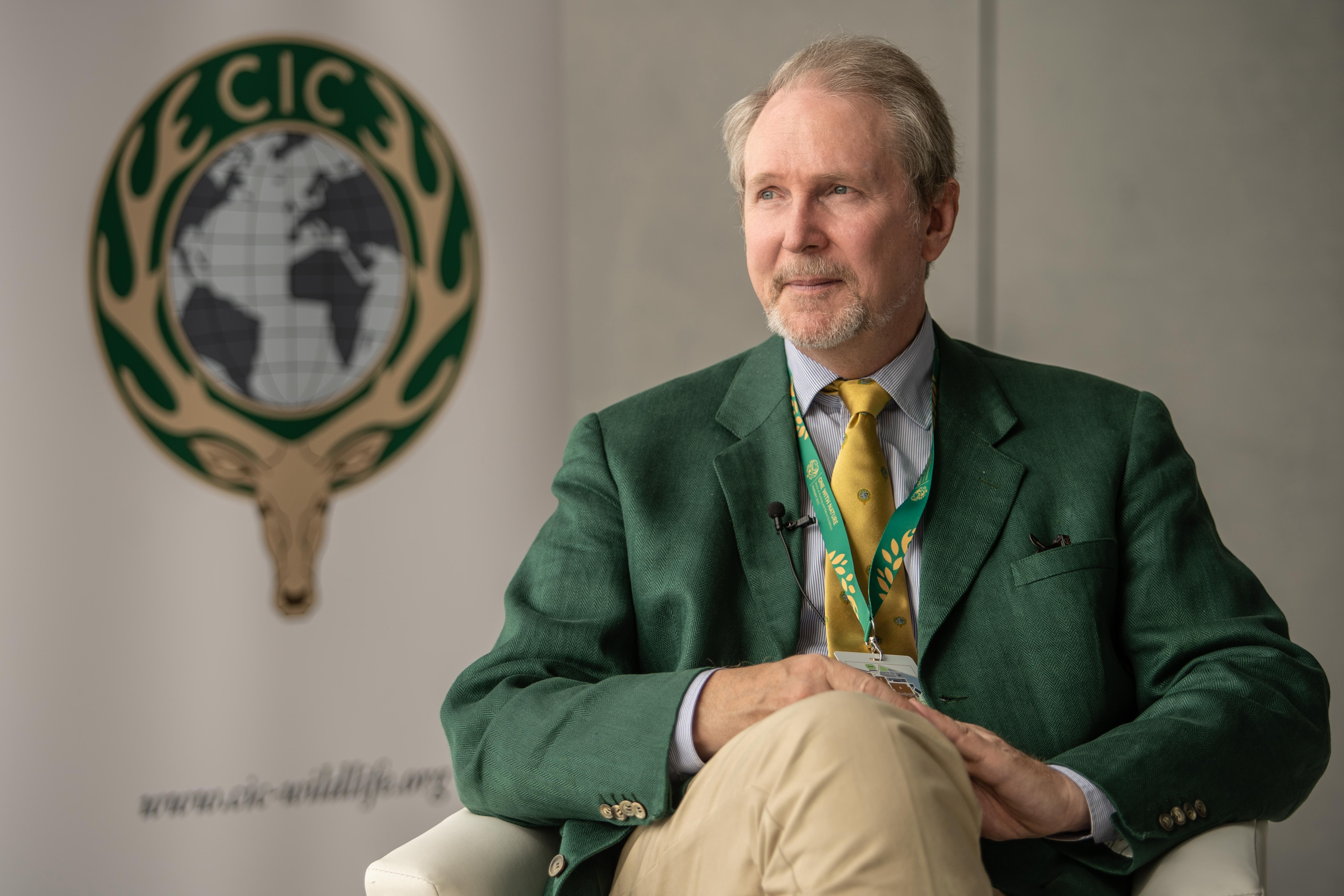
Dr. Philipp Harmer, former President of the CIC

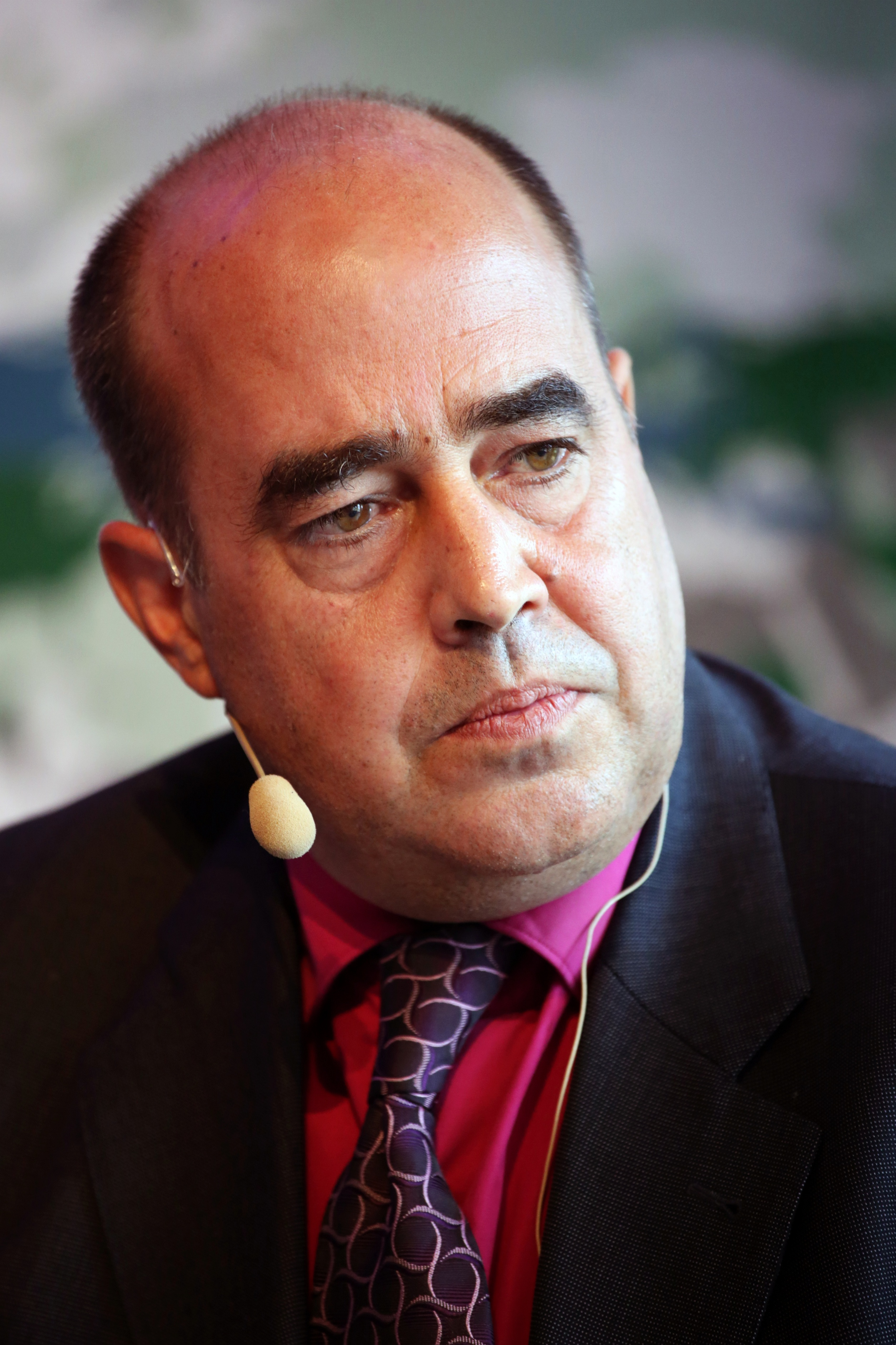
Sebastian Winkler, Director General of the CIC

Previous Presidents:
Name	Years
Maxime Ducrocq	1930–49
Claude Hettier de Boislambert	1950–59
H.H. Berthold von Zähringen	1959–62
Georg Graf Thurn-Valsassina	1962–65
Comte Enrico Marone Cinzano	1965–68
Dr. Johann Gerhard van Maasdijk	1969–72
Pál Vallus	1972–75
H.I.H. Abdul Reza Pahlavi	1975–81
Alfonso de Urquijo y Landecho	1981–84
Marco Bulć	1984–87
Dr. Luigi Musy	1987–90
Dr. Heinrich von Reuss-Köstritz	1990–93
Dr. Nicolás Franco y Pascual de Pobil	1993–99
Dieter Schramm	1999–2010
Bernard Lozé	2010–2016
George Aman	2016–2021
Dr. Philipp Harmer	2021–2026
Luis de la Peña Fernández-Nespral	2026–present

Director Generals (previously: General Administrators (1930-1999)
M. Villenave	1930–39
Claude Hettier de Boislambert	1950–59
Claude Chavane	1965–71
François Edmond-Blanc	1971–81
Jean Servat	1981–99
Previous Director-Generals:
Gábor Rácz-Fodor	1999–2001
Kai-Uwe Wollscheid	2002–2010
Tamás Marghescu	2010–2022
Previous Secretary-General:
Werner Trense	1972–99

== Working Groups ==
=== Young Opinion (YO) ===
The CIC Working Group – Young Opinion focuses on creating a global network of young conservationists under the age of 40 who are enthusiastic about wildlife and its sustainable management, in line with the views of the CIC.

The YO was launched at the 48th General Assembly of the CIC in 2000. Today, under the guidance of Krzysztof Kowalewski, President of the YO, the working group is promoting the values of the CIC through regular activities and events mainly focused on youth education and promoting game meat as a positive example of sustainable hunting.

Several international events have been held since the foundation of the Young Opinion Working Group. An example is the annual assembly the "Global Youth for Sustainable Use" (GYSU) – a multiple day event including scientific symposia and cultural exchange. The first GYSU event took place in 2005, and has since been organised by delegations from various countries every year.

One of the projects under the working group is the CIC Young Opinion Research Award – aimed at supporting researchers whose projects contribute to the sustainable use of wildlife for the benefit of natural heritage conservation. Thereby, the goal of the award is to promote scientific research in accordance with the spirit of the CIC's convictions.

=== Artemis ===
Recognising and advocating the role of women in the field of hunting, the CIC Artemis Working Group (WG) was founded in 2011 with the aim of uniting huntresses and women dedicated to sustainable use issues. Members of the Artemis WG are active in the field of environmental education, hunting culture and gastronomy, and in general as advocates for the role of women in wildlife management around the globe. The President is Soňa Chovanová Supeková.

== Partnerships ==
The CIC maintains alliances for promoting sustainable use as well as furthering wildlife policy and law development worldwide. Its main partners are:

United Nations Institutions: FAO (Food and Agriculture Organization of the United Nations), UNEP (United Nations Environment Programme), UNDP (United Nations Development Programme), UNESCO (United Nations Educational, Scientific and Cultural Organization)

Environmental Conventions: CBD (Convention on Biological Diversity); CITES (Convention on International Trade in Endangered Species of Wild Fauna and Flora); CMS (Convention on Migratory Species), with which a partnership agreement was signed in 2005; AEWA (Agreement on the Conservation of African-Eurasian Migratory Waterbirds); Convention on the Conservation of European Wildlife and Natural Habitats (Berne Convention); Ramsar Convention on Wetlands

International Non-Governmental Organisations: IUCN (International Union for Conservation of Nature); Wetlands International; IAF (International Association for Falconry); FACE (Federation of Associations for Hunting and Conservation of the European Union); IUGB (International Union of Game Biologists).

National Non-Governmental Organisations: The National Delegations of the CIC are also working together with NGOs of relevance to national or regional aspects of hunting and wildlife conservation.

=== Collaborative Partnership on Sustainable Wildlife Management (CPW) ===
The partnership originated in 2011 as an idea from the former Vice-chair of the CPW and past President of the Policy & Law Division of the CIC, Mr. Jan Heino. The inaugural Chair of the partnership was Mr. Braulio F. de Souza Dias, former Executive Secretary of Convention on Biological Diversity (CBD), with the Food and Agriculture Organization of the United Nations (FAO) holding the secretariat.

The CPW is a voluntary partnership of international organisations with substantive mandates and programs for the sustainable use and conservation of wildlife resources. The Mission of the CPW is:

to promote conservation through the sustainable management of terrestrial vertebrate wildlife in all biomes and geographic areas and to increase cooperation and coordination on sustainable wildlife management issues among its members and partners.

Today, the CPW unites fourteen international organisations, including the CIC, aiming to allow for a holistic and integrated approach to wildlife issues globally.

The first 1st Meeting of the CPW took place in Bangkok, Thailand, in March 2013 at the occasion of the 16th CITES Conference of the Parties (CoP).

Members

- Convention on Biological Diversity (CBD) Secretariat
- Center for International Forestry Research (CIFOR)
- Convention on International Trade in Endangered Species of Wild Fauna and Flora (CITES) Secretariat
- Convention on Migratory Species (CMS) Secretariat
- Food and Agriculture Organization of the United Nations (FAO)
- International Council for Game and Wildlife Conservation (CIC)
- International Indigenous Forum on Biodiversity (IIFB)
- International Institute for Environment and Development (IIED)
- International Trade Centre (ITC)
- International Union for Conservation of Nature (IUCN)
- International Union of Forest Research Organizations (IUFRO)
- TRAFFIC – The Wildlife Trade Monitoring Network
- United Nations Environment Programme (UNEP)
- World Organisation for Animal Health (OIE)

=== CIC - FAO ===
The collaboration between the CIC and the Food and Agriculture Organization of the United Nations (FAO) dates back to the year 2002. The joint work led to the analysis and documentation of the main weaknesses of current environmental policy and legislation and the priority needs for technical support of countries seeking to improve their legal documents. The outcomes of this partnership on wildlife included a series of joint CIC-FAO publications (Technical Series).

In past, the CIC together with FAO, worked on an international, online database of wildlife management legislation entitled WildlifeLex. Its aim was to serve as a platform for hosting and linking wildlife management legislations, including key statistics, best practice examples and other relevant materials, from different countries and regions.

== General Assemblies ==
The General Assembly is the highest organ of the CIC. The First General Assembly of the CIC was the constituting assembly in Paris in 1930. Thereafter, it became an annual event, taking place in one of the member countries of the CIC. Events include not only the meeting of the permanent members, but also partners, representatives of organisations from UN agencies, the Federation of Associations for Hunting and Conservation of the EU (FACE), the International Union of Game Biologists (IUGB), the Convention on International Trade in Endangered Species of Wild Fauna and Flora (CITES), International Union for Conservation of Nature (IUCN), the European Landowners' Organisation (ELO), the World Organisation for Animal Health (OIE) and major international conventions such as the Convention on Biological Diversity (CBD), as well as government delegations, national and international hunting organisations and wildlife experts.

The core program of the General Assemblies is split into three main parts as per the Divisions. In addition, there are focused meetings of working groups and experts from different countries.

The Jubilee 60th General Assembly of the CIC took place in the three countries: Czech Republic, Slovakia and Hungary, from 26–30 April 2013 – the core area where the concept of the CIC was developed in the early 20th century. Experts gathered to discuss the topic of wildlife management under the motto "Hunting: Conserving Wildlife – Key to Global Cultural Heritage".

The 61st General Assembly was hosted by the Italian Delegation of the CIC, in the city of Milan, from the 23–26 April 2014. Hunting, Youth and Biodiversity will be the main theme of the 61st General Assembly, with the fight against wildlife crime forming an important sub-topic, with a Global Summit entitled "Hunters United Against Wildlife Crime" being organised in the framework of the event. A symposium on "Hunting Ungulates between Tradition and Innovation: the Naturalist Hunter for Sustainable Wildlife Management" preceded the events of the 61st General Assembly on the 23 April 2014.

"Healthy Wildlife – Healthy People". With this motto the 62nd General Assembly in Pravets, Bulgaria, raised awareness on the fact that the purpose of wildlife conservation is not only to promote biodiversity richness, but also to keep our own human existence at a healthy, balanced level. Wildlife diseases are of great concern to hunters everywhere in the world. Wildlife diseases may result in declining wildlife population numbers and genetic diversity and may have long-term effects on habitats and ecosystems. Certain wildlife diseases can be transmitted to domestic livestock or vice versa, resulting in economic stress being placed on rural communities and national economies. Some zoonotic diseases entail great health risk to the human population with a range of serious consequences. Hunters are the largest group in society that voluntarily interacts with wildlife closely and frequently. The World Organization of Animal Health (OIE), being the global platform of veterinarians, and CIC, as a global organization promoting conservation through the sustainable use of wildlife, understood this need for strong cooperation and took action. As keynote speaker Dr. Bernard Vallat, OIE Director General, addressed the CIC General Assembly during the Opening Ceremony. He called upon hunters and the CIC to make the most of the force they represent in the field: protecting biodiversity, and acting as sentinels for the protection of public health. Vallat made a strong case for hunter training in the detection, monitoring, and control of wildlife diseases. The patron of the 62nd General Assembly, was the Prime Minister of Bulgaria, H.E. Boyko Borisov, who viewed the selection Pravets as place for the 62nd General Assembly as recognition of Bulgaria's successful and well-known wildlife management in recent years. After a strong decline of big game 10 to 15 years ago, Bulgaria managed to bring back the wildlife populations to a healthy level for the benefit of future generations.

The 63rd General Assembly under the motto "Hunting is Conservation" was organised in Brussels, Belgium, with the aim to foster the participation and dialogue between members and various stakeholders, including governments, international organizations, the scientific and academic communities, so as to promote sustainable hunting and sustainable policies for worldwide wildlife management, so as to create awareness of wildlife problems, motivate commitment at the highest level for their solution, and thus promote better management of sustainable hunting and wildlife conservation at local, regional, national and international levels. Karel Pinxten, Dean of European Court of Auditors, in his welcome remarks, highlighted that hunters are responsible for sustainable hunting practices, predator control, and habitat improvement, and these three areas show our commitment for sustainable hunting. As a keynote speaker, Jyrki Katainen, Vice- President of the European Commission addressed the audience during the Opening Ceremony. The Commissioner for Job, Growth, Investment, and Competitiveness, and an active hunter, highlighted that being a hunter requires "Responsibility, Sustainability and Transparency". He called upon hunters and organizations to make the most of the force they represent. "We should work together on our common conservation goals." The Opening Ceremony was followed by a panel discussion, "What if we stop hunting?", where five experts from around the world sat down and discussed the environmental, social, and economic impacts of hunting bans. Addressing an audience of over 300 participants, the session was opened by Karl-Heinz Florenz, Member of the European Parliament and the President of the Intergroup "Biodiversity, Hunting and Countryside", who suggested that hunters should convince the animal rights activists that they are actually on the same side. Representatives exchanged their points of view and shared their stories. The general outcome was that if hunting is banned, wildlife would suffer and there would be losses of entire populations. According to the panelists, this has already been happening in some areas of Africa where previously stable populations, like that of elephant and rhino, have significantly decreased.

The 64th General Assembly of the International Council for Game and Wildlife Conservation (CIC) opened its doors in Montreux, Switzerland, in 2017 with the motto is "Harmony with Wildlife - Urban and Rural Perceptions". This slogan was selected as over the past couple years, with the rise of easily-accessible media reports and social connectivity, differences in perceptions of hunting and hunters are increasingly conflicting in all areas of the world. These strongly opposing views create a divide among people which is deepened with the increasing presence of media in our lives where information, either correct or not, can reach hundreds of thousands of people in a matter of days. For hunting, a highly emotive topic, this has already proven to be a hindrance its use as a conservation tool, despite its many successes, and it could be detrimental to its future unless we fight back.

The 65th General Assembly of the International Council for Game and Wildlife Conservation under the motto "Hunting: Facts or Fables?" was organized in Madrid, Spain, on 4-5 May 2018. During the two day event, the participants discussed and deliberated the aspects of hunting, which are currently under attack by its opponents.

The 66th General Assembly was organised in Windhoek, in the capital of Namibia in 2019 in the framework of an international conference under the theme "Crossroads- Leading the Way for Wildlife Conservation". The conference, hosted by the Ministry of Environment and Tourism of Namibia, served as a platform for workshop style discussions and presentations on wildlife conservation successes, challenges, and best practices from Namibia, Africa and across the world. At a time when wildlife conservation appears to be at a crossroads, this conference brings together various stakeholders to discuss related issues from African, European, and Global perspectives, as well as taking a unique look at the important roles youth and women will play in the future success of conservation efforts. The ultimate aim being to bring conservation efforts together onto a common path.

The 67th General Assembly of the CIC in 2021 was a special one. Not only was it be hosted in Budapest, the home of the CIC Administrative Office, it was also held within the framework of Hungary’s One with Nature – World of Hunting and Nature Exhibition. As patrons of the event, the CIC was involved in the planning of the exhibition from 2013 onwards. To mark this historic occasion, rurality was chosen as the overarching theme, under the motto “One with Nature - Rural Voices, Global Responsibilities.” Every year the rural-urban divide grows larger, with people becoming increasingly alienated from nature in all parts of the world. The General Assembly therefore looked at the importance of protecting rural areas, and their associated wildlife, habitats and people. This was explored through a series of panel discussions and events at a conference which was held in the framework of the General Assembly.

Mottos of the last 17 GA's:
Year	City	Number	Motto
21 – 24 May 2003	Helsinki	50th	Young People of the World for Sustainable Use
27 April – 1 May 2004	Bucharest	51st	Wildlife knows no borders
12 – 16 March 2005	Abu Dhabi	52nd	Falconry: A World Heritage
1 – 5 May 2006	Limassol	53rd	Conservation of Migratory Birds – A Shared Responsibility
2 – 5 May 2007	Belgrade	54th	Passion for Wildlife Means Caring For People
22 – 26 April 2008	Marrakesh	55th	Hunting: A Tool for Sustainable Rural Development
30 April – 2 May 2009	Paris	56th	Hunting: A Passion for the Future
6 – 9 May 2010	Dubrovnik	57th	Biodiversity of the Mediterranean region: Challenges and Perspectives for Hunters
12 – 15 May 2011	Saint Petersburg	58th	Hunting - A Part of our Cultural Heritage
8 – 11 May 2012	Cape Town	59th	Economics of Wildlife Conservation
26 – 30 April 2013	Budapest	60th	Hunting: Conserving Wildlife – Key to Global Cultural Heritage
24 – 26 April 2014	Milan	61st	Youth, Hunting and Biodiversity
23 – 25 April 2015	Pravets	62nd	Healthy wildlife, Healthy people
22 – 23 April 2016	Brussels	63rd	Hunting is conservation
27- 29 April 2017	Montreux	64th	Harmony with Wildlife - Urban and Rural Perceptions
3 - 5 May 2018	Madrid	65th	Hunting: Facts or Fables?
1 - 4 May 2019	Windhoek	66th	Crossroads - Leading the Way for Wildlife Conservation
25 - 28 September 2021	Budapest	67th	One with Nature - Rural Voices, Global Responsibilities
9 - 12 June 2022	Riga	68th	Conserve – Convene – Communicate
20 - 23 April 2023	Paris	69th	Restore - Rewild - Remind

== Awards and Prizes ==
The CIC awards the following prizes:

- Edmond Blanc Prize

This prize is given to hunting areas for excellent hunting practices and special achievements in the management of wildlife.

- Markhor Award

The Markhor Award recognizes and celebrates outstanding conservation performances that link the conservation of biodiversity and human livelihoods to the application of the principles of sustainable use, in particular hunting, as part of wildlife and ecosystem management. The name "Markhor" comes from Pakistan's threatened mountain goat species (Ovis ammon polii), the population numbers of which have increased substantially in recent years through sustainable hunting tourism.

The award is presented every two years at the Conference of Parties to the Convention on Biological Diversity (CBD CoP). The award consists of a bronze statue of a Markhor and a financial reward.

- Wildlife Photo Prize

The Wildlife Photo Prize is an international competition on wildlife photography, which is open to all professional or amateur photographers. This bi-annual prize is awarded for the best photographs of wild animals, both mammals and birds, living in their natural environment. The winning photographs are exhibited during the following CIC General Assembly.

- Hunting in Art Prize

Every two years, the CIC discerns the Hunting in Art prize to artists, in recognition of their efforts to enhance the cultural values of nature and hunting. The prize is awarded in the fields of sculpture, painting, museums or a specific exhibit therein, as well as in the field of music.

- Young Opinion Research Award

The CIC Young Opinion Research Award is aimed at supporting researchers whose projects contribute to the sustainable use of wildlife for the benefit of natural heritage conservation. Thereby, the goal of the award is to promote scientific research in accordance with the spirit of the CIC's convictions.

- Literature Award

This is an annual award for outstanding publications, presented at the occasion of the CIC General Assembly. The Jury consists of CIC members from different countries, with a total of five award categories:

- Technical: a work about the research and science of huntable game.
- Artistic: for exceptionally interesting and artistically valuable publications about huntable game.
- Literary: for hunting and nature adventures, which communicate the joy of hunting and nature, not only to a small group of people but to a broader public.
- Environmental: the purpose of this prize is to award published educational works, which support the understanding amongst the general public of the needs of hunting, the hunters, environmental issues, as well as those of game and its natural habitat.
- Cultural Prizes: for the lifetime work of an author

== Recommendations and Resolutions ==
The CIC serves in an advisory role to the governments and environmental organisations regarding questions on sustainable hunting, wildlife management practices and conservation. Thus, the CIC regularly proposes recommendations and resolutions for consideration by the global community.

== Trophy Evaluation System ==
Since its inception in the 1920s, the CIC Trophy Evaluation System (TES) has established itself as the leading trophy scoring system throughout Europe, and further afield. Over time, the system has been adapted in order to account for changes in wildlife management. As part of the restructuring of the old TES, the CIC Trophy Measuring Rules and Regulations were adopted in 2012. The TES operates through Senior International Trophy Judges (SITJ) and Certified CIC Measurers, who are eligible to measure trophies on behalf of the CIC and to award CIC points. Each SITJ and Certified CIC Measurer receives an individual Identification Card which serves to officially identify qualified CIC measurers. Together, all SITJ make up the CIC Trophy Evaluation Board (TEB) which is responsible for overseeing the TES and for the training of Certified CIC Measurers.

The International Formulae for the Measurement and Evaluation of Trophies of the CIC, previously known as the Red Book, underwent extensive review and was subsequently published as the "CIC Handbook on the Evaluation and Measuring of Hunting Trophies".

The TES is part of the Applied Science Division, which also cooperates and coordinates its work with the CIC Administrative Office, CIC Coordination Fora, and official National Hunting Associations and Trophy Measuring Associations registered with the CIC.

== CIC Publications ==
The CIC regularly publishes newsletters, reports, magazines and other documents on issues related to its work, in order to raise awareness and provide information about sustainable hunting and relevant topics of concern to conservation.

=== CIC Magazines ===
The "CIC Magazine" is published twice a year. The magazine contains recent news and information about CIC's activities.

=== CIC-FAO Technical Series 1-9 ===
Under the FAO-CIC partnership on wildlife, the following nine joint publications were published:

- Best Practices in Sustainable Hunting
- European Charter on Hunting and Biodiversity
- Principles for Developing Sustainable Wildlife Management Laws
- Developing Sustainable Wildlife Management Laws in Western and Central Asia
- A Practical Summary of Experiences after Three Decades of Community-based Wildlife Conservation in Africa "What are the Lessons Learnt?"
- The Selous–Niassa Wildlife Corridor in Tanzania: Biodiversity Conservation from the Grassroots
- A Comparison of the Prices of Hunting Tourism in Southern and Eastern Africa
- Contribution of Wildlife to National Economies
- Wildlife Law in the Southern African Development Community

=== The Evolution of CITES ===
The Evolution of CITES was first published in 1985. The author, Willem Wijnstekers, former Deputy President of the Division Policy and Law. The book contained an annotated catalogue of CITES decision-making since the Convention entered into force in 1975, together with Resolutions and Decisions of the Conference of the Parties, providing a clearer understanding of the linkages.

The book was regularly updated after every meeting of the Conference of the Parties and translated from English into French and Spanish.

=== The CIC Caprinae Atlas of the World ===
Authored by Gerhard R. Damm, former President of the Applied Science Division and Dr. Nicolás Franco, Honorary President of the CIC, the CIC Caprinae Atlas of the World presents an overview on the distribution ranges of wild Caprinae phenotypes in the northern hemisphere, their physical appearance, life history, conservation status and sustainable use.

Volume I and Volume II – circa 520 pages each. Publication date is March 2014.

== Fundraising ==
As a non-profit organisation, the CIC is funded through the support of its members.

== See also ==
- Junta Nacional de Homologación de Trofeos de Caza
- Expo 71: a hunting themed world's fair in Budapest.
