= Expo 71 =

1971 hunting exposition in Budapest, Hungary

1971 Budapest

Overview
- BIE-class: Specialized exposition
- Name: Expo Budapest
- Area: 35 hectares (86 acres)
- Visitors: 1,9 mln

Participant(s)
- Countries: 52

Location
- Country: Hungary
- City: Budapest

Timeline
- Opening: 27 August 1971
- Closure: 30 September 1971

Specialized expositions
- Previous: HemisFair '68 in San Antonio
- Next: Expo '74 in Spokane

Universal expositions
- Previous: Expo '70 in Osaka
- Next: Seville Expo '92 in Seville

Expo 1971 Budapest was a Specialised Expo organised under the theme of Hunting and recognised by the Bureau International des Expositions. It was held in Budapest, Hungary from 27 August to 30 September 1971. The Expo welcomed 52 countries and gathered 1.9 million visitors.

The International Council for Game and Wildlife Conservation (CIC) implemented its newly recognised rules at the Expo. The Expo featured a Wildlife Film Festival and thematic symposiums.
