= Nicolás Franco (naturalist) =

Spanish naturalist and economist

Nicolás Franco y Pascual de Pobil (born 22 October 1937) is a Spanish naturalist and economist who was President of the International Council for Game and Wildlife Conservation between 1993 and 1999. He is a nephew of Francisco Franco as the only son of his older brother, Nicolás Franco.

== Biography ==
Nicolás Franco was born in 1937 in Rome during his father's time as ambassador of Spain in Italy. His father was Nicolás Franco y Bahamonde, the eldest child of Nicolás Franco y Salgado-Aráujo and María del Pilar Bahamonde y Pardo de Andrade, and was a brother of Francisco Franco, who ruled Spain from 1939 to 1975. His mother was María Isabel Pascual de Pobil y Ravello.

A close friend of Juan Carlos I during his exile in Estoril, he was sent to study in England at Downside School, a Roman Catholic boarding school in Stratton-on-the-Fosse, where he stayed from 1953 to 1954.

He received his doctorate in Economics from the Centre d'Etudes Industrielles of Geneva in 1959. He was later a fellow associate with Walter Adams at the Michigan State University.

After many years of his hunting exploits travelling around the world, he was elected President of the International Council for Game and Wildlife Conservation (CIC) in 1993, where he served for most of the 1990s.

== See also ==
- Francoist Spain
- House of Franco
