= August von Spiess =

Romanian officer and hunter

Col. August Roland von Spiess
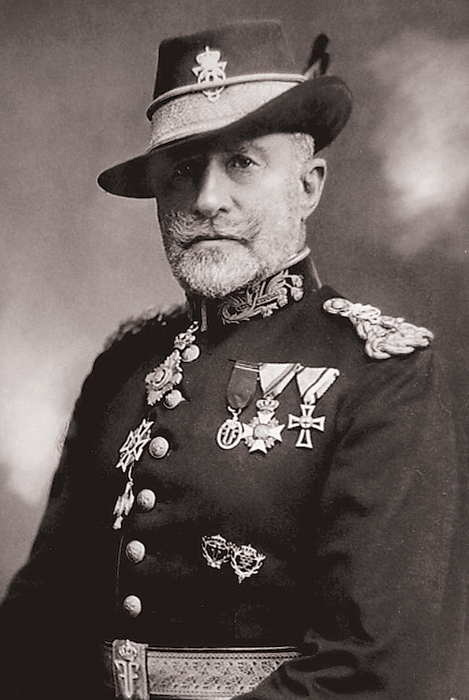
- Col. August Roland Von Spiess Braccioforte
- Born: (August 6, 1864; Przemyśl, Austrian Empire
- Died: 1953); Sibiu, Romania
- Military career
- Allegiance: Kingdom of Romania
- Service years: 1885-1939
- Rank: Oberst, Colonel and Royal Hunts Master
- Commands: Romanian 2nd Infantry Regiment
- Awards: Huntmaster of Romanian Royal Court
- Other work: Conservationist, writer

Col. August Von Spiess, also spelled von Spieß (August 6, 1864 – 1953), formally known as Oberst August Roland von Braccioforte zum Portner und Höflein, was an officer, writer, famous hunter and Hunting Master for the Romanian royal court.

Von Spiess was born in Austria and became a Romanian citizen after the Union of Transylvania with Romania, following the dissolution of Austria-Hungary. He was married to Auguste Herbert from Sibiu. Their daughter was the ornithologist Silvia Stein Spiess (1901–1993).

In 1875, at 11 years old, he entered the military school of Sankt Pölten, after which he joined the Theresian Military Academy of Wiener Neustadt, Vienna. After 10 years of military studies, in August 1885 he became a lieutenant in the Transylvanian 64th Infantry stationed in the Orăştie-Sebeş-Alba Iulia area. In May 1889 he advanced to the rank of Major and settled in Sibiu, where he acted as drill officer. In 1893 he became a professor at the Military Infantry Cadet School of Sibiu; in 1911 he was named commander of the school. In February 1915, he advanced to the rank of Colonel and took command of the 2nd Regiment Infantry in Sibiu.

Von Spiess finished his military career after the end of World War I, and was appointed by King Ferdinand I of Romania as Director of the Royal Hunts from 1 July 1921. He kept this function until 1939. Simultaneously, he was a member of the Commission for Protection of Nature and National Parks, alongside honorary memberships of many domestic and foreign societies and associations with similar interests.

Von Spiess, after a Carpathian bear hunt.

In 1926, Von Spiess and his daughter initiated a project to tag the birds of Snake Island, Romania. He led two hunting expeditions in equatorial Africa, in Kenya in 1936 and in Tanganyika in 1938. He was a fine observer of nature, a connoisseur of game habits and a keen hunter, and gathered during his life a collection of over 1,000 hunting trophies. He also wrote a number of books pertaining to animals and hunting, mostly tied to the Carpathian Mountains region.

In 1963 his entire animal and arms collection was donated to the Brukenthal Museum in Sibiu. Later the collection became the August Von Spiess Hunting and Hunting Arms Museum and was expanded with similar collections. The museum is now hosted in a dedicated country villa.

== Books ==
- Karpathenhirsche. Waidwerk aus fünf Jahrzehnten (Carpathian Stags. Hunting Trophies Of Five Decades) Paul Parey, Berlin, (1925)
- Im Zauber der Karpathen. Fünfundfünfzig Jahre Waldwerk (Under The Spell Of Carpathians. Fifty-five Years Of Hunting) Paul Parey, Berlin, (1933).
- Siebzehn Jahre Im Rumänischen Hofjagddienst (Seventeen Years In The Service Or Romanian Royal Hunts), F.C. Maye, München, 1940.
- Din Ardeal In Kilimandjaro, Vanatori In Africa (From Transylvania to Kilimandjaro, Hunts In Africa).
- Caprele Negre Din Masivul Retezat (The Chamoises Of Mount Retezat), Editura Hora, Sibiu, 2005.
- Die Wildkammern des Retezatmassivs als königliches Gemsgehege. Sein Tier- und Vogelleben, seine Geschichte und Jagd, 1933, Krafft & Drotleff, Hermannstadt.
