= Gyulaj =

- Location of Tolna county in Hungary

- Location of Gyulaj
- Coordinates: 46.50751°N 18.29138°E
- Country: Hungary
- County: Tolna

Area
  - Total: 70.82 km^{2} (27.34 sq mi)

Population (2004)
  - Total: 1,112
  - Density: 15.7/km^{2} (41/sq mi)
- Time zone: UTC+1 (CET)
  - Summer (DST): UTC+2 (CEST)
- Postal code: 7227
- Area code: 74

Gyulaj is a village in Tolna County, Hungary.
