= European Federation for Hunting and Conservation =

- Abbreviation: FACE
- Formation: 1977; 49 years ago
- Headquarters: Brussels
- Secretary General: David Scallan
- President: Laurens Hoedemaker
- Website: www.face.eu

The European Federation for Hunting and Conservation (FACE) is a pro-hunting advocacy group based in Brussels. Established in 1977, FACE is a non-profit nongovernmental organisation. FACE is made up of national hunters’ associations from 37 European countries, including all the 27 EU member states, and is supported by 7 associate members.
