= Alonso Álvarez de Toledo, 12th Marquess of Valdueza =

Spanish nobleman

The Most Excellent The Marquess of Valdueza GE
- Born: 30 September 1939 (age 85); Llodio, Spain
- Spouse: Isabel Argüelles y Salaverría (m. 1963)
- Children: 3
- Parents: Alonso Álvarez de Toledo y Cabeza de Vaca, 11th Marquess of Valdueza (father); María del Pilar de Urquijo y Landecho (mother)

Alonso Álvarez de Toledo y Urquijo, 12th Marquess of Valdueza, GE (born 30 September 1939) is a Spanish nobleman. He is the current president of the Junta de Homologación and formerly of the Spanish delegation of the International Council for Game and Wildlife Conservation, an organ he was also vice-president of.

== Early life ==
He was born in Llodio, a small town in the Basque Country, where his maternal family was originally from. His father was Alonso Álvarez de Toledo y Cabeza de Vaca, 11th Marquess of Valdueza, and his mother was María del Pilar de Urquijo y Landecho, daughter of Estanislao de Urquijo y Ussía, 3rd Marquess of Urquijo and 1st Marquess of Bolarque. Through his mother, he was a nephew of Alfonso de Urquijo, notorious hunter who was president of the CIC between 1981 and 1984.

He is one of the select group of 8 boys who was sent to study with the future Juan Carlos I on 9 November 1948. Franco improvised a boarding school in "Las Jarillas", a hunting finca north of Madrid belonging to Alonso's uncle, the 4th Marquess of Urquijo. He included 8 children of some of the most aristocratic families of Spain, with the aim of educating the young prince in the traditional upper-class Spanish way. The other children were Infante Carlos, Duke of Calabria, Fernando Falcó, 3rd Marquess of Cubas, Jaime Carvajal y Urquijo, Juan José Macaya y Aguinaga, José Luis Leal y Maldonado and Alfredo Gómez Torres.

He was styled "Viscount of la Armería" (vizconde de la Armería), the title held by the heir to the Marquessate of Valdueza, between 1963 and 2000, when he ceded it to his eldest son, Fadrique. At the death of his father in 1988, he inherited the title of "Marquess of Valdueza" with Grandeeship attached.

== Issue ==
He married Isabel Argüelles y Salaverría, daughter of Jaime Argüelles y Armada, grand cross of the Order of Charles III and of Margarita Salaverría y Galarraga, dame of the Order of Isabella the Catholic, 8 June 1963 at San Fermín de los Navarros in Madrid. She is the sister of Pedro Argüelles, who was Secretary of State for Defence between 2012 and 2016.

- Sonsoles Álvarez de Toledo y Argüelles (b. 1965)
- Fadrique Álvarez de Toledo y Argüelles, 14th Viscount of la Armería (b. 1968)
- Pedro Álvarez de Toledo y Argüelles (b. 1973)

== Titles ==
- 12th Marquess of Valdueza (GE)
- 13th Viscount of la Armería (1963-2000)

== Bibliography ==
- Priego, Count of (2017). Cazadores Españoles del Siglo XX. Turner Publicaciones. ISBN 978-84-16714-29-2.

Spanish nobility
Preceded by Alonso Álvarez de Toledo y Cabeza de Vaca	Marquess of Valdueza; 9 May 1988 –	Incumbent
Preceded by Alonso Álvarez de Toledo y Cabeza de Vaca	Viscount of la Armería; 4 January 1951 – 28 August 1987	Succeeded by Fadrique Álvarez de Toledo y Argüelles
