= Gandarias =

Gandarias is a surname. Notable people with the surname include:

- Andrés Gandarias (1943–2018), Spanish road bicycle racer
- José Gandarias (1904–1979), Spanish footballer, sailor and businessman
- Pedro Pascual Gandarias (1843–1901), Spanish industrialist and entrepreneur
  - Juan Tomás Gandarias (1870–1940), Spanish businessman and politician, son of Pedro Pascual
  - Pedro Gandarias (1901–1986), Spanish athlete, politician, and financier, son of Juan Tomás
- Sofía Gandarias (1957–2016), Spanish painter

== See also ==
- Bouea macrophylla, commonly known as gandaria in English, a species of flowering plant native to Southeast Asia
