= Urquijo =

Urquijo is a surname. Notable people with the surname include:

- Adolfo de Urquijo e Ibarra (1866–1933), Alfonsist politician, publisher, and expert in Basque culture and history
- Alfonso de Urquijo (1920–1994), Spanish professional hunter, writer and banker
- Álvaro Urquijo (born 1962), Spanish guitarist and singer-songwriter
- Antonio María Oriol Urquijo (1913–1996), Spanish politician and businessman
- Araceli Sánchez Urquijo (1920–2010), Niños de Rusia child evacuee during the Spanish Civil War, first woman to work as a civil engineer in Spain
- Enrique Urquijo (1960–1999), Spanish singer, songwriter, and guitarist
- Gonzalo Urquijo (born 1989), Argentine professional footballer
- Harold Urquijo (born 1988), Colombian footballer
- José Antonio Urquijo (born 1960), Chilean former track cyclist
- José María de Oriol y Urquijo (1905–1985), Spanish entrepreneur, Carlist and Francoist politician
- Julio de Urquijo e Ibarra (1871–1950), Basque linguist, cultural activist, and a Spanish Carlist politician
- Luis de Urquijo, 2nd Marquess of Bolarque (1899–1975), Spanish Ambassador to West Germany
- Mariano Luis de Urquijo (1769–1817), Secretary of State (Prime Minister) of Spain
- Miguel Primo de Rivera y Urquijo (1934–2018), Spanish politician, lawyer and businessman
- Myriam de Urquijo (1918–2011), (born Pilar Palacios de Urquijo), Argentine film, stage and television actress
- Rocio Urquijo (1935–2009), Spanish artist, first wife of Filipino industrialist Enrique Zobel

== See also ==
- Marquess of Urquijo (Spanish: Marqués de Urquijo) is a noble title in the peerage of Spain
- Assassination of the Marquesses of Urquijo
