= Luis María de Ybarra =

Spanish banker, businessman, and sports leader

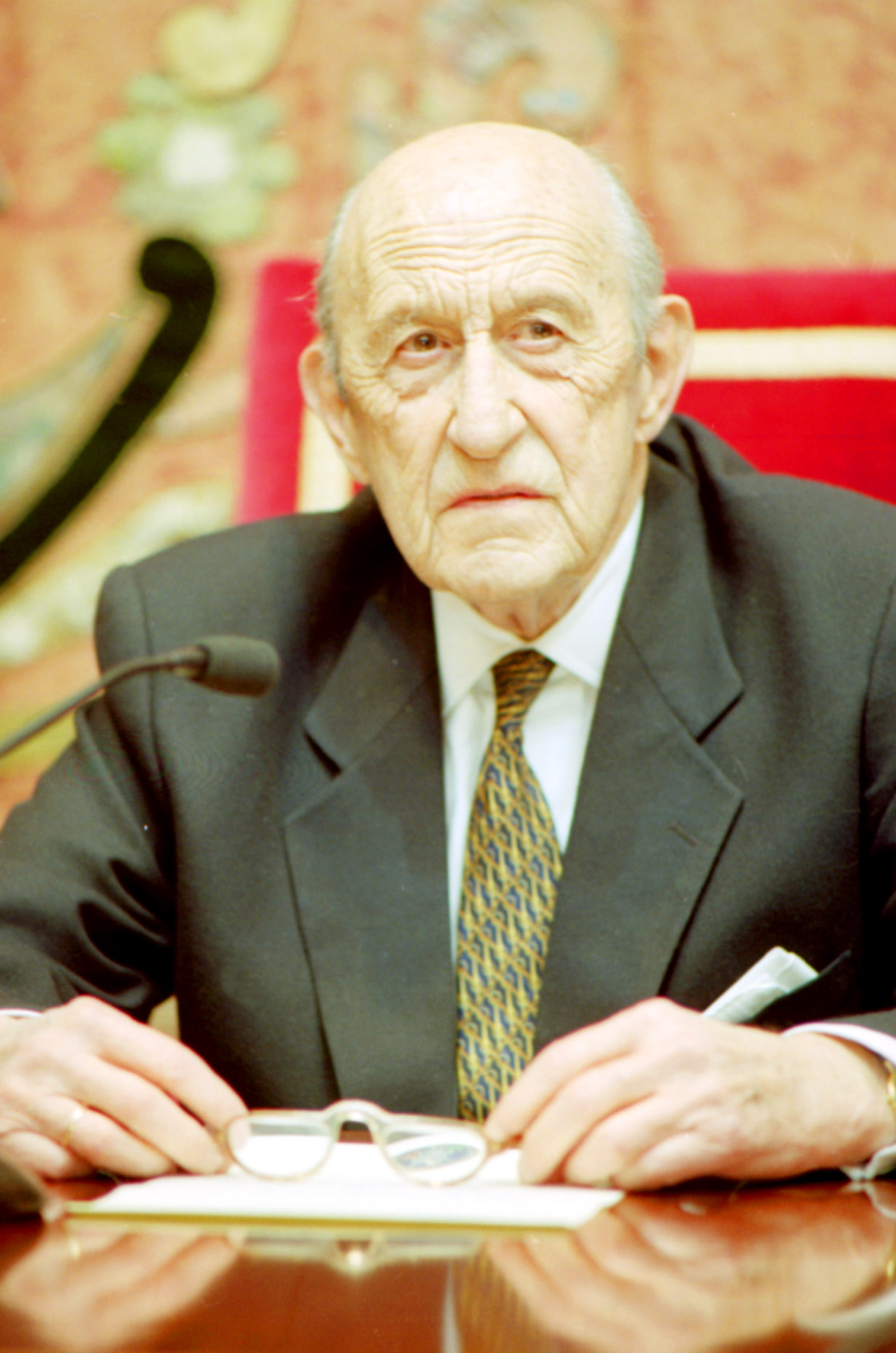
- Ybarra in the Aula Magna of the University of Navarra.
- Born: Luis María de Ybarra y Oriol; 20 November 1912; Getxo, Biscay, Spain
- Died: 10 March 2001 (aged 88); Getxo, Biscay, Spain
- Occupations: Banker; Businessman; Sports leader
- Known for: President of the Royal Spanish Golf Federation

4th President of the Royal Spanish Golf Federation
- In office April 1959 – January 1965
- Preceded by: Luis de Urquijo
- Succeeded by: Luis de Urquijo

Vice president of Banco de Vizcaya
- In office 1966–1976

Luis María de Ybarra y Oriol (20 November 1912 – 10 March 2001) was a Spanish banker, businessman, and sports leader. He was the president of Fuerzas Eléctricas del Oeste, a member of Iberduero, vice president of Banco de Vizcaya between 1966 and 1976, and also served as the 4th president of the Royal Spanish Golf Federation between 1959 and 1965.

== Early life, education, and personal life ==
Luis María de Ybarra was born on 20 November 1912 in Getxo, Biscay, as the third and last son of Fernando María de Ybarra y de la Revilla, 1st Marquis of Arriluce de Ybarra and María Ángeles de Oriol y Urigüen. With quite an age difference, compared to his siblings Fernando and Isabel, his childhood was peaceful and happy in the small residential area of Neguri, where his parents had moved at the end of the 19th century.

Shortly before the start of the Spanish Civil War, Ybarra completed his studies at the Commercial University of Deusto, and on 11 February 1936, he married Flora Zubiría y Calbetón. After the arrest and subsequent murder of his father and his older brother and two nephews on the Cabo Quilates prison ship, Ybarra had to hide for several months, without being able to meet his eldest daughter who had been born during this period. His wife, Flora, had taken refuge with the girl in San Sebastián.

== Career in the press ==
His father Fernando, and his uncle Gabriel and Emilio, founded El Pueblo Vasco ("The Basque People") on 1 May 1910, which went on to merge with El Correo Español on 12 April 1938, which resulted in the creation of El Correo. In December 1939, Javier Ybarra Bergé, son of one of the founders Gabriel, was appointed as its CEO, and Luis María, among others, as advisors.

== Banking career ==
Ybarra, together with his cousin Javier Ybarra Bergué, the two survivors of the Ybarra-Zubiría family, held positions of responsibility in financial and energy companies that had a notable influence on Spanish economic life, throughout the postwar period and during the forties and fifties.

On 7 July 1937, Ybarra was appointed director of Hidroeléctrica Ibérica, replacing his deceased father, and in 1944, he achieved the merger with Saltos do Douro, which resulted in the creation of Iberduero, one of the five most important companies in the sector worldwide. Luis María held the vice presidency until 1950.

His professional activity in the banking sector developed between 1937 and 1976. In November 1937, Ybarra took office as a member of the Board of Directors of Banco de Vizcaya, at the request of his uncle Gabriel Ybarra, who had been one of the co-founders of the bank in 1902. Luis María held the vice presidency of the bank for 10 years, from 1966 to 1976, the year in which he became a director, a position that he held until late 1987, just prior to the merge agreement between Banco de Vizcaya and Banco de Bilbao, although the vacancy that he left was occupied by his son Luis María de Ybarra y Zubiría.

In 1975, Ybarra proposed Ángel Galíndez, who was his brother-in-law, and Federico Lipperheide, for the presidency and vice presidency of Banco de Vizcaya, respectively. The two of them, along with Luis María himself and his uncle, Fernando Ybarra, formed the hard core of the bank, while the Banco de Bilbao was chaired by another branch of the family, where Emilio Ybarra Churruca served as a senior official.

== Other endeavours ==
Ybarra served as the 4th president of the Royal Spanish Golf Federation between April 1959 and January 1965, and on the following year, on 6 June 1966, the federation awarded him, along with the likes of Javier de Arana, a Medal of Merit in Golf.

Ybarra was part of the Privy Council of Juan de Borbón, since one of his brothers-in-law, Juan Tornos, was a member of Don Juan's Diplomatic Cabinet and that the widow of his older brother, murdered in the Civil War, was for a long time lady-in-waiting to Borbón.

A man of deep religiosity, Ybarra supported various charitable institutions, such as the Santa y Real Casa de Misericordia de Bilbao, and participated in the launch of the Gaztelueta school and the University of Navarre. In the latter, he was linked to the Business and Humanism Institute, whose creation he contributed directly, being its executive and later honorary president from 1986 until his death.

== Death ==
Ybarra died at his home in Neguri, on 10 March 2001, after a long illness. The funeral took place three days later on 13 March, at seven in the afternoon, in the parish church of San Pedro Apóstol. On 10 March 2002, a year after his death, the only Ybarra surname that remained on the BBVA board was that of his son, then 59 years old, the link that united the new bank with the old tradition.
