= Pedro Gandarias =

Spanish athlete, politician, and financier

- Born: Pedro Pascual Gandarias Urquijo; 16 February 1901; Madrid, Spain
- Died: April 8, 1986; Madrid, Spain
- Citizenship: Spanish
- Occupations: Athlete; Politician; Financier
- Known for: President of the Club Puerta de Hierro
- Father: Juan Tomás Gandarias

President of the Puerta de Hierro club
- In office 1922–1923
- Preceded by: Count of Romanones
- Succeeded by: Ángel Ossorio y Gallardo

Pedro Pascual Gandarias Urquijo (16 February 1901 – 1986) was a Spanish athlete, politician, and financier. He was an important board member of club Puerta de Hierro in Madrid, and was one of the six founders of the Royal Spanish Golf Federation. He was also a bullfighting rancher, being the owner of the Castillo de Higares ranch.

As an athlete, he played football for the youth team of Madrid FC and hockey for Atlético Madrid, and he was also an international golf player. In politics, he was a senator by appointment of the Crown, and on 6 March 1939, he was one of the people chosen by Franco to be part, as deputy mayor, of the City Council of Madrid chaired by Alberto Alcocer.

== Early and personal life ==
Gandarias was born on 16 February 1901 in Madrid, as the son of Juan Tomás Gandarias Durañona, a businessman from Biscay (1870–1940), and Cecilia Urquijo y Ussía, daughter of the Marquess of Urquijo. His birth came just two days after the death of his grandfather, Pedro Pascual Gandarias, so he was named in his honor. He was the oldest of seven children, five sons and two daughters, including Juan Manuel and José.

Gandarias married Isabel Alós, daughter of the Marquess of Haro and a four-time Spanish golf champion between 1932 and 1935, a sport in which he also became international.

== Sporting career ==
=== Football ===
The three oldest Gandarias brothers, Pedro, Juan Manuel, and José, all played football for Madrid's youth team, but only one of them made it to the first team in a friendly match in 1916, with most investigations and historians agreeing that the identity of this Gandarias most likely belongs to José, even though he was only 12 at the time while Pedro was 15. He was a midfielder.

=== Golf ===
At some point in the early 1930s, Gandarias became the right-hand man of the president of Club Puerta de Hierro, a private country club based in Madrid that had a long-recorded history and sections in the fields of golf, tennis, polo, equestrianism, and Et cetera. On 9 October 1932, the representatives of the main golf clubs in Spain of the time: Pedro Cabeza de Vaca of Club de Campo, Pedro Gandarias of Club Puerta de Hierro, Santiago Ugarte of Club de Lasarte, Marcelino Botín of Club de Pedreña, Luis de Olabarri of Club de Neguri, and Javier de Arana of Club de Sevilla, met at the home of Luis de Olabarri in Las Arenas to found the Royal Spanish Golf Federation.

=== Bullfighting ===
Gandarias was also a bullfighting rancher, whose cattle grazed on the Castillo de Higares farm, in the municipality of Mocejón, in the province of Toledo. In 1954, Castillo de Higares was used to film the 1954 movie Chateâux en Espagne ("The Bullfighter"), a Spanish-French co-production directed by René Wheeler and starring a popular actress, Danielle Darrieux, who denounced the rigging of the bullfights and vindicated the purity of "The Bullfighter" compared to the actual bullfights.

== Later life ==
In politics, Gandarias was a senator by appointment of the Crown, and on 6 March 1939, he was one of the people chosen by Franco to be part, as deputy mayor, of the City Council of Madrid chaired by Alberto Alcocer.

Gandarias participated in numerous boards of directors, presiding over companies such as Iberavia, La Basconia S.A., and Portland (1930), and being a vice president of Naviera Aznar, S.A. and Banco Urquijo, a bank founded by his father and in which he obtained and held several relevant positions of responsibilities, such as a member on the board of directors between 1944 and 1974. He was also a director of Constructora Naval, Minas del Rif, Altos Hornos, Unión Española de Explosivos, Firestone, Compañía de Fernando Poo, Eléctrica de Castilla, and Unión Eléctrica Madrileña.
