= Alfonso de Urquijo =

- Born: 31 July 1920; Llodio, Spain
- Died: 23 September 1994 (aged 74); Jaén, Spain
- Military career
- Allegiance: Francoist Spain
- Branch: Blue Division
- Service years: 1941–1943 (World War II)
- Rank: Lieutenant

Alfonso de Urquijo y Landecho (31 July 1920 – 23 September 1994) was a Spanish professional hunter, writer and banker. Following his success as an international hunter, he was appointed President of the International Council for Game and Wildlife Conservation in 1981. He was a younger brother of Luis de Urquijo, who was President of Real Madrid from 1926 to 1930.

== Biography ==
=== Early years ===
Alfonso de Urquijo was born the 31st July 1920 in Llodio, a town in the Basque Country province of Álava, in Northern Spain. The Urquijo's were one of the most prominent families in 20th Century Spain, with very close ties to the Spanish royal family. His father, Estanislao de Urquijo y Ussía, was the 3rd Marquess of Urquijo (Grandee of Spain), 1st Marquess of Bolarque and Chairman of Telefónica. His mother was María del Pilar Landecho y Allendesalazar.

His siblings include Luis de Urquijo, 2nd Marquess of Bolarque and María del Pilar, who married Alonso Álvarez de Toledo, 11th Marquess of Valdueza.

=== Military service ===
In 1941, Urquijo volunteered as a soldier when Franco sent the Blue Division to fight the Soviets alongside Nazi Germany during the Winter campaign of World War II. During his time in service, he rose to the rank of Lieutenant.

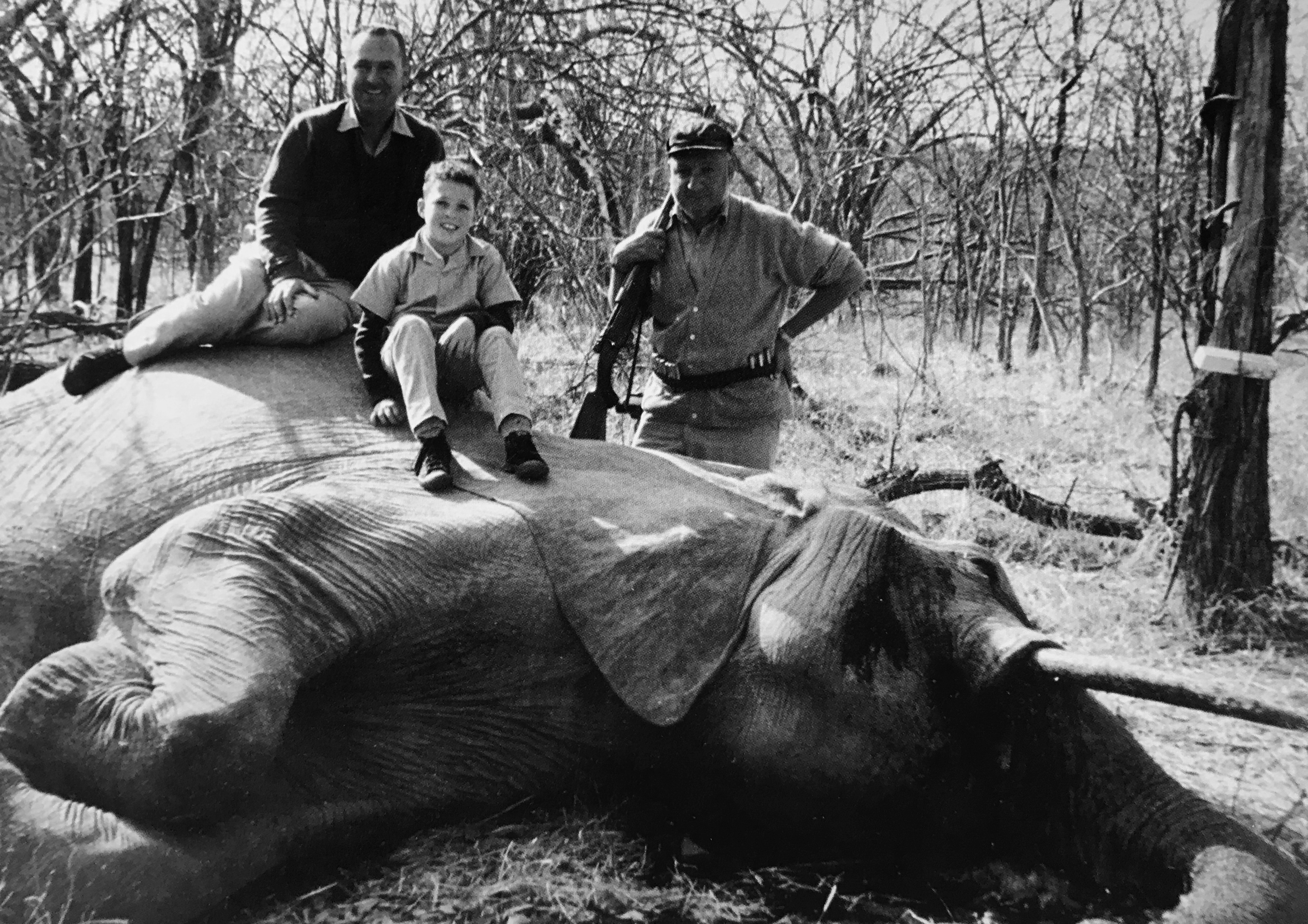
Urquijo (left) with the Duke of Peñaranda (right) during an Elephant hunt in Bamboosi, Mozambique, 1962

=== Later years ===
Urquijo died on 23 September 1994 in his finca, "Nava el Sach", in Jaén, Southern Spain.

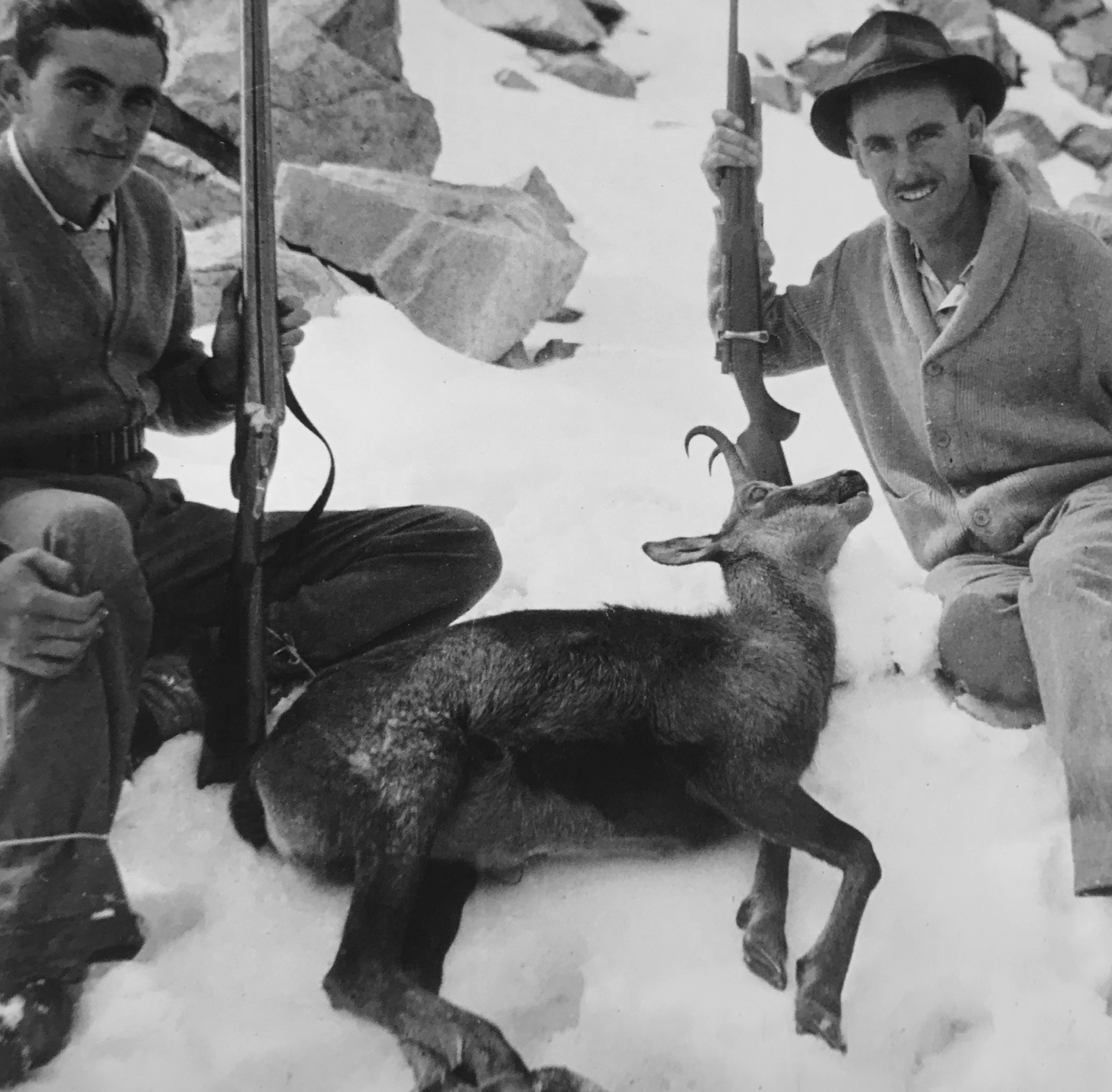
Urquijo (right) with his nephew and a dead Pyrenean chamois, 1950

== Selected works ==
- Abonado y síntomas de carencia en el maíz, Ministerio de Agricultura, Madrid, 1955.
- El Canto del Hamerckop. Cacerías de dos españoles en África., Taurus, Madrid, 1965.
- El Pirineo y los Sarrios, Taurus, Madrid, 1967.
- Cuando Empuñamos las Armas, Editorial Moneda y Crédito, Madrid, 1973.
- Alto Aragón. Su Naturaleza, Energía e Industriales Aragonesas, Madrid, 1975.
- Umbría y Solana (Recuerdos y diálogos de montería):
  - I: Con trabuco y caracola, Giner, Madrid, 1980.
  - II: La flor de la jara, Giner, Madrid, 1981.
  - III: El tornillazo, Giner, Madrid, 1981.
- Relación de fincas de montería, o en las que se celebran ganchos, con sus correspondientes parajes (Separata de la Flor de la Jara), Faresa, Madrid, 1981.
- Los Serreños (Retazos cinéticos y camperos de Sierra Morena), Editorial Olivo, Sevilla, 1986.
- África Incierta. Recechos de Animales raros, Aldaba Ediciones, Madrid, 1988.
- Altos Vuelos, Aldaba, Madrid, 1989.
- Rumbo a Poniente. Mis cacerías por el nuevo mundo, Aldaba, Madrid, 1990.
- Bestiario de Sierra Morena, Aldaba, Madrid, 1996.

== See also ==
- List of famous big game hunters
