= Alonso Álvarez de Toledo, 11th Marquess of Valdueza =

Spanish peer (born 1903)

The Most Illustrious The Marquess of Valdueza
- Born: 1 October 1903; Madrid, Spain
- Died: 28 August 1987 (aged 83); Ávila, Spain
- Spouse: María del Pilar de Urquijo y Landecho (m. 1930)
- Children: 5
- Parents: Alonso Álvarez de Toledo y Samaniego, 10th Marquess of Villanueva de Valdueza (father); María de La Paz Cabeza de Vaca y Fernández de Córdoba (mother)

Alonso Álvarez de Toledo y Cabeza de Vaca, 11th Marquess of Valdueza (1 October 1903 – 28 August 1987) was a Spanish peer and dog breeder. Known to have created his own breed of scent hounds which carry his name, "perro montero Valdueza", he was a recognised hunter and one of the founding fathers of the Junta de Homologación as well as a board member of the International Council for Game and Wildlife Conservation and member of the Shikar Club.

== Early life ==
He was born in Madrid to Alonso Álvarez de Toledo y Samaniego, 10th Marquess of Valdueza, and María de La Paz Cabeza de Vaca y Fernández de Córdoba, daughter of the 8th Marquess of Portago.

Álvarez de Toledo inherited the Marquessate of Valdueza and the Viscountcy of la Armería in 1951. He succeeded his father as Marquess of Valdueza and his brother Mariano as Viscount of la Armería when the latter died prematurely.

He died in Ávila 28 August 1987.

== Issue ==
He married María del Pilar de Urquijo y Landecho, daughter of the 1st Marquess of Bolarque, 10 October 1930 at San Fermín de los Navarros in Madrid. She was the sister of Luis de Urquijo, president of Real Madrid and Alfonso de Urquijo, also a notable hunter. They had five children:

- María Álvarez de Toledo y Urquijo (1931-2019)
- Sonsoles Álvarez de Toledo y Urquijo (b. 1932)
- Isabel Álvarez de Toledo y Urquijo (b. 1935)
- Alonso Álvarez de Toledo y Urquijo, 12th Marquess of Villanueva de Valdueza (b. 1939)
- María Teresa Álvarez de Toledo y Urquijo

== Titles ==
- 11th Marquess of Valdueza
- 12th Viscount of la Armería

== Bibliography ==
- Priego, Count of (2017). Cazadores Españoles del Siglo XX. Turner Publicaciones. ISBN 978-84-16714-29-2.

Spanish nobility
Preceded by Alonso Álvarez de Toledo y Samaniego	Marquess of Valdueza; 4 January 1951 – 28 August 1987	Succeeded by Alonso Álvarez de Toledo y Urquijo
Preceded by Mariano Álvarez de Toledo y Cabeza de Vaca	Viscount of la Armería; 4 January 1951 – 28 August 1987	Succeeded by Alonso Álvarez de Toledo y Urquijo
