= Fadrique Álvarez de Toledo =

Fadrique Álvarez de Toledo may refer to:

- Fadrique Álvarez de Toledo, 2nd Duke of Alba (1460-1531)
- Fadrique Álvarez de Toledo, 4th Duke of Alba (1537-1583)
- Fadrique Álvarez de Toledo y Mendoza, Marquis of Villanueva de Valdueza (1580-1634)
- Fadrique Alvarez de Toledo y Ponce de León, 7th Marquis of Villafranca del Bierzo and Viceroy of Sicily (1635-1705)
- Fadrique Álvarez de Toledo y Moncada, 9th Marquis of Villafranca del Bierzo (1686-1753)
