= Royal Spanish Golf Federation =

Governing body of golf in Spain

- Real Federación Española de Golf
- Abbreviation: RFEG
- Formation: October 9, 1932; 94 years ago
- Founded at: Getxo, Basque Country, Spain
- Headquarters: Centro Nacional de Golf, Madrid, Spain
- Members: 293,560 (2022)
- President: Gonzaga Escauriaza
- Affiliations: Spanish Olympic Committee International Golf Federation European Golf Association
- Website: https://www.rfegolf.es/

The Royal Spanish Golf Federation (Spanish: Real Federación Española de Golf; RFEG) is the governing body of Golf in Spain. It was formed on 9 October 1932 in Getxo, a town in the Basque Country, a northern region of Spain. It is current headquarters are located in the Centro Nacional de Golf, a golf complex located in Madrid which has a 18-hole course, a driving range and a clubhouse that also hosts the RFEG offices

It's the body in charge of the organization of golf in Spain at a national level, and therefore supervises golf competitions, the handicap system, and all of the Spanish golf national teams. It works in cooperation with all of the regional federations in order to promote and organize the sport.

At the end of 2022, it had 293,550 members, a 3% increase since the year prior.

== History ==
It was originally formed as the Federation of Golf Clubs of Spain on 9 October 1932 at the home of Luis de Olabarri in Las Arenas (Guetxo), where a meeting was held between representatives of the main golf clubs in Spain of the time: Pedro Cabeza de Vaca of Club de Campo, Pedro Gandarias of Real Club de la Puerta de Hierro, Santiago Ugarte of Club de Lasarte, Marcelino Botín of Club de Pedreña, Luis de Olabarri of Club de Neguri, and Javier de Arana of Club de Sevilla.

== Presidents ==
Throughout its history it has had 10 presidents, since December 2008, the president is Gonzaga Escauriaza.

Royal Spanish Golf Federation presidents
| President | Period |
|---|---|
| Luis Arana | 1934-1936 |
| Francisco Carvajal | April 1939 – April 1950 |
| Luis de Urquijo | April 1950 – April 1959 |
| Luis María de Ybarra | April 1959 – January 1965 |
| Luis de Urquijo | January 1965 – June 1968 |
| Juan Antonio Andreu | June 1968 – July 1974 |
| Juan Manuel Sainz | July 1974 – April 1981 |
| Juan Castresana Ávila | April 1981 – December 1981 |
| Luis Figueras-Dotti | December 1981 – November 1988 |
| Emma Villacieros | November 1988 – December 2008 |
| Gonzaga Escauriaza | December 2008 – current |
