= Viscount of la Armería =

Spanish nobility title

Viscountcy of la Armería
- Creation date: 9 March 1694
- Created by: Charles II
- Peerage: Peerage of Spain
- First holder: José de Aldaz y Aguirre, 1st Viscount of la Armería
- Present holder: Fadrique Álvarez de Toledo y Argüelles

Viscount of la Armería (Spanish: Vizconde de la Armería) is a hereditary title in the Peerage of Spain, granted in 1694 by Charles II to José de Aldaz y Aguirre, owner of two of the most important armouries in Spain, the "Real Fábrica de Armas de Orbaizeta" and the "Real Fábrica de Municiones de Olaverri", hence the name of the title (armería is Spanish for armoury).

It was traditionally held by the heir apparent to the Marquessate of Monte Real, but it was eventually incorporated into the House of Valdueza and is now used by the heir to that title.

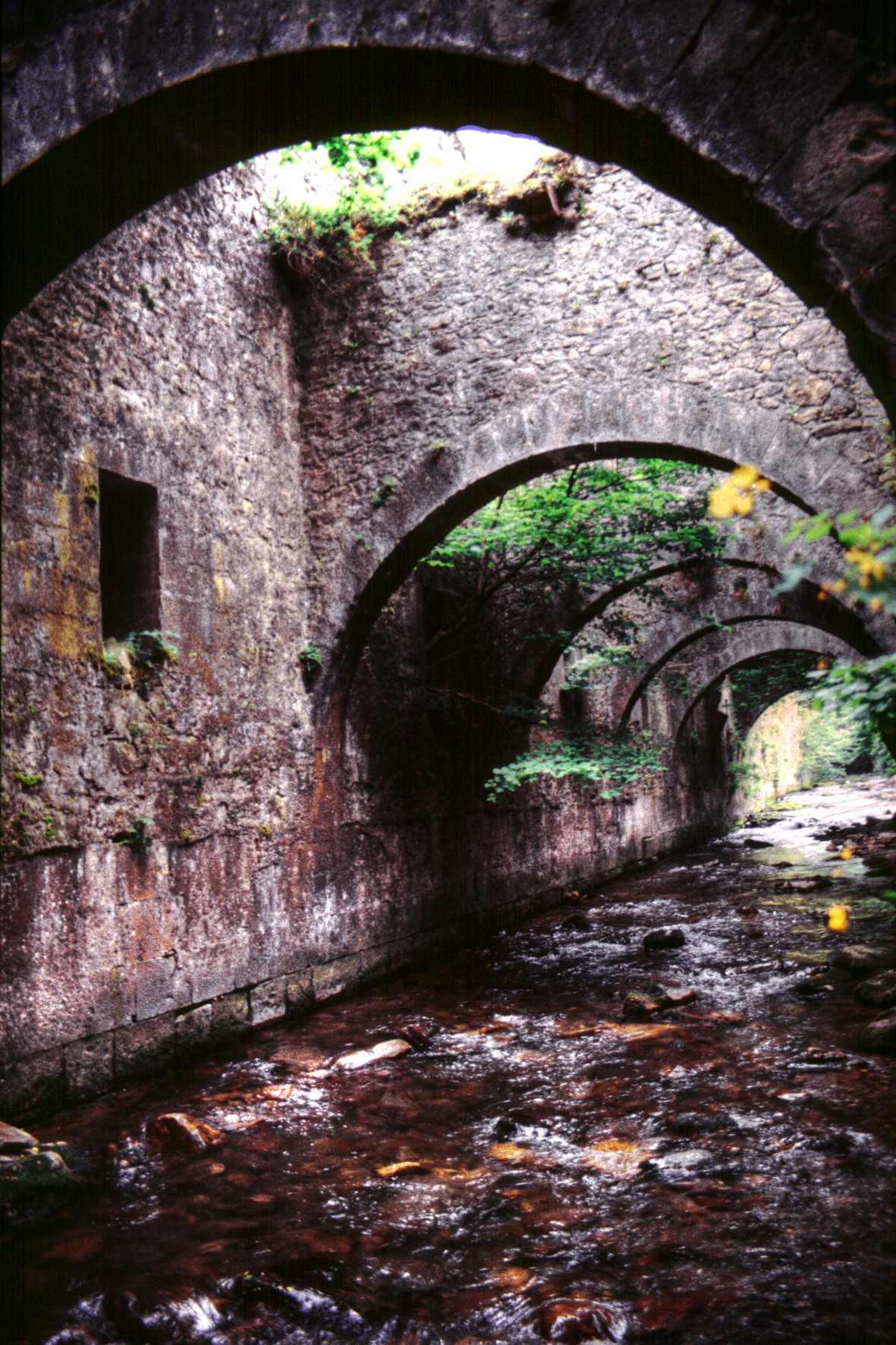
Remains of the "Real Fábrica de Armas" in Orbaizeta, Navarre

== Viscounts of la Armería (1694) ==
- José de Aldaz y Aguirre, 1st Viscount of la Armería
- María Josefa de Samaniego y Flores de Septién, 2nd Viscountess of la Armería
- Pedro de Samaniego Montemayor y Córdoba, 3rd Viscount of la Armería
- Manuel de Samaniego y Pizarro, 4th Viscount of la Armería
- Matías de Samaniego y Pizarro, 5th Viscount of la Armería
- María Donata de Samaniego y Pizarro, 6th Viscountess of la Armería
- Juana Regis de Armendáriz y Samaniego, 7th Viscountess of la Armería
- Joaquín Antonio de Samaniego y Urbina, 8th Viscount of la Armería
- Manuel de Samaniego y Asprer, 9th Viscount of la Armería
- Honorio de Samaniego y Pando, 10th Viscount of la Armería
- Mariano Álvarez de Toledo y Cabeza de Vaca, 11th Viscount of la Armería
- Alonso Álvarez de Toledo y Cabeza de Vaca, 12th Viscount of la Armería
- Alonso Álvarez de Toledo y Urquijo, 13th Viscount of la Armería
- Fadrique Álvarez de Toledo y Argüelles, 14th Viscount of la Armería

== See also ==
- Orbaizeta

== Bibliography ==
- Hidalgos de España, Real Asociación de (2018). Elenco de Grandezas y Títulos Nobiliarios Españoles. Ediciones Hidalguía. ISBN 978-84-94841-02-6.
