= Luis Arana =

Luis Arana may refer to:

- Luis Arana (politician) (1862–1951), Basque nationalist politician
- Luis Arana (athlete) (1876–1951), Spanish footballer and sailor
- Luis Ignacio de Arana (1909–1999), Spanish golfer
