= Luis Ignacio de Arana =

Spanish golfer

- Full name: Luis Ignacio de Arana y Ybarra
- Country (sports): Spain
- Born: 1909
- Died: 15 January 1999 (aged 89–90)

Luis Ignacio de Arana y Ybarra (1909 – 15 January 1999) was a Spanish amateur golfer who won multiple titles in Spanish amateur tournaments.

He was the younger brother of Javier de Arana, who also played golf.

== Early and personal life ==
Luis Ignacio de Arana was born in 1909 as the son of Luis Arana y Urigüen and Dolores de Ybarra y Lope de Calle. His father was a successful businessman who was deeply involved with the introduction of sports to Bilbao at the beginning of the 20th century, practicing football, athletics, sailing and golf.

Arana married Sofía de Ybarra y Mac-Mahón, and the couple had five children, Íñigo, Iciar, Gonzalo, Teresa, and Álvaro de Arana e Ybarra. The book Veranos en el Cantábrico (Summers in Cantabria) delves into the family album of the aristocracy and upper bourgeoisie who spent their holidays in the Basque Country, Cantabria, and Asturias, and includes a picture of Íñigo in the arms of his mother Sofía in Ereaga and another shows the little Iciar on board of the yacht "María del Carmen", property of the Count of Cadagua, amidst a group of girls, governesses and a sailor from the ship.

== Sports career ==
Luis Ignacio started playing golf at the age of 10 years, in the 11-hole course of the Real Sociedad de Golf de Neguri, which had been co-founded by his father in 1911 and was located a mere 500 meters from his summer home in Las Arenas, Getxo.

Together with his brother Javier, he became the leading Spanish amateur golfer, as well as one of the best players in Continental Europe, displaying a great competitiveness between them both on and off the course. Notably, Luis Ignacio faced his younger brother in eight consecutive Puerta de Hierro National Cup finals, winning three of them in 1932, 1935, and 1941. The tournament was suspended during the Spanish Civil War, being reopened in 1941 under the new name of Spanish International Amateur Championship, with Arana winning its inaugural edition and then adding a further two titles in 1947 and 1949, beating in the finals Eugenio Machado and Enrique Fernández Villaverde, respectively. He also won the national Amateur Championship three times in 1941, 1943, and 1945, beating Agusto Batlló and Santiago Ugarte in the latter two finals.

== Later life ==
In his later life, Arana became a professor at the J.L.T Higher School of Bilbao. In 1975, he wrote and published a book called "Exercises, topics and problems in topography, geodesy and position astronomy".

== Death ==
Arana died on 15 January 1999, at the age of 90. The funeral service was celebrated on the following day, at seven in the afternoon, in the parish church of Nuestra Señora de las Mercedes in Las Arenas.
