= Emma Villacieros =

Spanish golfer and sports leader

Personal information
- Full name: Emma Villacieros Machimbarrena
- Nationality: Spain
- Born: 1 January 1932 San Sebastián, Basque Country, Spain
- Died: 9 May 2018 (aged 86) Madrid, Spain
- Spouse: Antonio García Ogara Wright (m. 1958)
- Children: Emma Villacieros de García-Ogara

Career
- Sport: Golf
- Current tour: PGA Tour
- Professional wins: 10

Number of wins by tour
- PGA Tour: 7
- European Tour: 2

9th President of Spanish Golf Federation
- In office November 1988 – December 2008
- Preceded by: Luis Figueras-Dotti
- Succeeded by: Gonzaga Escauriaza

Emma Villacieros Machimbarrena (1 January 1932 – 9 May 2018) was a Spanish golfer and sports leader, who served as the 9th president of the Royal Spanish Golf Federation, a position she held for over 20 years, from November 1988 to December 2008, and was subsequently named honorary president until her death. She is widely regarded as one of the most important figures in the development of golf in Spain, contributing decisively to its growth and normalization within Spain since it was during her mandate that Spanish golf experienced its second and most impressive 'boom', supported by an unprecedented increase in the number of courses and licenses, to the point of turning golf into a fashionable sport in Spain. For her contribution to the development of the sport throughout her life, she was awarded the Premios Nacionales del Deporte (Francisco Fernández Ochoa) in 2012.

During her playing career, she won numerous competitions, including the Spanish Women's Amateur Championship five times, and the Italian Women's Amateur International Championship. As captain, she was twice European Women's Amateur Champion and bronze medalist at the 1986 World Championship. She also played more than 30 international matches with the Spanish team. She has been described as an elite amateur player with enormous drive both on and off the courses.

== Early and personal life ==
Emma Villacieros was born on 1 January 1932 as the son of Antonio Villacieros Benito, the Count of Villacieros, who was Ambassador of Spain and Chief of Protocol of the Royal Household of Spain of Juan Carlos I, and María del Carmen Machimbarrena Aguirrebengoa.

== Sporting career ==
=== Playing career ===
Villacieros started playing golf by chance when she was 18 years old. Due to her father's work as a diplomat, she moved with her family to Ecuador and very close to the house where she lived there was a golf course. In her new location, she did not know many people and her lack of friends made this sport become an outlet for her loneliness and a passion that she would maintain throughout her life. She played a lot and in just one year she reached a handicap of 10. She preferred the short game, giving more importance to intelligence than to hitting with strength.

Upon her arrival in Spain, Villacieros became a member of the Real Club de Golf de Lasarte, which was her first club. While playing alone she met her husband, Antonio García Ogara Wright, whom she married in 1958 in the Church of Santa María in San Sebastián. Her husband's work took her to Madrid where she continued playing and achieving sporting success alongside female golfers of the caliber of Merche Etchart and Cristina Marsans.

Throughout his sporting career, Villacieros won numerous trophies, including the Spanish Women's Amateur champion five times, in 1957, 58, 65, 69 and 71, twice runner-up in the European Women's Amateur, winner of the International Women's Amateur Italian Championship, thirty internationals with the Spanish team, and European Seniors Team champion in 1996. Also as captain she obtained important results: twice European Women's Amateur champion and bronze medal at the 1986 World Championship.

=== Presidency of the Spanish Golf Federation ===
In the 1960s, all sectors of the Royal Spanish Golf Federation (RFEG), especially women's and youth, were revitalized through the creation of their own Committees within the federative organization chart, and the Women's Technical Committee was entrusted to Villacieros in 1965, a time when golf was a minor sport and in which there were only about 40 female golfers. She eventually rose up through the ranks until becoming the president of the Federation, thus becoming one of the first women to reach a management position in sports administration. She held this position for 20 years, until 2008, then holding the honorary presidency until her death.

In 2005, she was re-elected with 113 votes in favor of the 129 possible, thus comfortably beating the other candidate, Gonzalo Guzmán, whose first reaction was to congratulate the winner with a warm hug since both had shared responsibilities between 1988 and 1998, as President and Vice President of the RFEG.

=== Popularizing golf ===
Emma was an enthusiastic and devoted Captain. She collected all victories one can achieve in Amateur Golf. She liked to discuss and place ideas to improve always for the better of the game of golf. And she had a good sense of humour as well! To enhance Elite Golf in Spain, in Europe and the whole Golfing World was Emma's goal. She was a unique person and very much respected. Emma dedicated a big part of her life to the Game Golf.

— Marion Thannhäuser, an Honorary President of the EGA.

It was during her mandate that Spanish golf experienced its second and most impressive 'boom', supported by an unprecedented increase in the number of courses and licenses, to the point of turning golf into a fashionable sport in Spain. The objective of the Federation during the presidency of Villacieros was to popularize this sport in Spanish society for it to stop being a minority, an objective for which he had at all times the collaboration of all sectors of this sport, such as the Autonomous Federations, the clubs, and the constant work of the members of the board of directors and the different Committees of the RFEG. To achieve this, she promoted measures such as the construction of public courses throughout the country, such as Can Sant Joan, La Llorea, and Abra del Pas in 1995 alone, and the creation of a National Golf School, first located in El Escorial, and later in Madrid, to lay the foundations of the sport and providing it with the best training conditions to achieve success. On 7 March 2006, and after more than 15 years of tough negotiations between Villacieros and the then Secretary of State for Sports Javier Gómez-Navarro, the National Golf Center was inaugurated in Madrid, a public course and headquarters of the RFEG that now bears her name. Upon his arrival to the presidency, the number of federated members amounted to 45,000 federated members, reaching 330,000 at the end of his term. Likewise, the number of golf courses increased from 91 to more than 300.

She was instrumental in helping take the 1997 Ryder Cup match in Spain, which until then had only been held between the United Kingdom, Ireland, and the United States, thus leaving the British Isles for the first time to take place at the Valderrama Golf Club, located in Cádiz.

In the latter stages of her presidency, Villacieros' efforts were focused on seeing golf become an Olympic sport, which she failed to accomplish under her mandate, and in fact, she played a leading role in securing golf's readmission into the modern Olympic Games. Thanks to her special efforts, having to convince quite a few members of federations from other countries, she saw golf, which had already been an Olympic discipline in 1900 and 1904, compete again in the 2016 Olympics Games.

== Later life ==
An active athlete throughout her life, she always wanted to encourage women's love of playing golf and create a pool of talented golfers who would add success to Spanish sport. From 2006 to 2012 she was President of the International Women's Golf Federation, and was an honorary vice president of the European Tour in 2009.

In addition to the trophies in the practice of golf, his contribution to the sport earned him numerous awards and decorations throughout his life, including the Order of Isabella the Catholic in 1998, and the Gold Medal of the Golf Federation of the Principality of Asturias. In 2012, Villacieros was awarded the Francisco Fernández Ochoa category of the Premios Nacionales del Deporte, to "reward the trajectory of a life dedicated, in a notorious way, to the practice, organization, direction, promotion, and development of Sports".

== Death ==
Villacieros died in Madrid on 9 May 2018, at the age of 86.

== Sports honors ==
- Spanish Women's Amateur Champion (1957, 58, 65, 69 and 71).
- One-time winner of the Italian International Women's Amateur Championship.
- Second classified in the European Women's Amateur Championship. (on two occasions)
- Two-time European Women's Amateur Champion (as captain).
- Gold Medal from the 1986 World Championship (as captain).
- More than 30 times international with the Spanish team.
- Member of the Spanish team in the World Championships of 1964, 1966, 1970, 1972, 1974 and 1976.
- European Seniors Team Champion in 1996.

== Professional positions ==
- President of the Women's Amateur Technical Committee of the RFEG (1966–1988).
- Member of the board of directors of the European Golf Association.
- General Secretariat of the Golf World Cup Organization in 1965 and 1972.
- Member of the board of directors of the Higher Sports Council (1997–2000)
- President of the Real Club de Golf Sotogrande (1979–1988).
- President of the Royal Spanish Golf Federation (1988–2008).
- President of the National Committee for the preparation of the Ryder Cup '97.
- President of the International Women's Golf Federation (2006–2012)
- Honorary President of the Royal Spanish Golf Federation (2008–2018)
- Member of the Jury of the Prince of Asturias Sports Awards 2000, 2001, 2002, 2003, 2004, 2005, 2006, 2007, 2008 and 2009.
- Honorary Vice President of the European Tour (2009).

== Awards, recognitions, and distinctions ==
- Francisco Fernández Ochoa National Sports Award in 2012
- Gold Medal for Sports Merit (1998).
- Royal Order of Isabel La Católica (1998)
- Christer Lindberg Bowl Award (2001)
- Medal of Merit in Golf from the RFEG in 1968
- Gold Medal from the Asturian Golf Federation
- Gold Medal from the Navarra Golf Federation
- Gold Medal from the Andalusian Golf Federation
- Gold Medal from the Murcia Golf Federation
- Gold Medal from the Madrid Golf Federation
- Gold Medal from the Cantabrian Golf Federation
- Gold Medal from the Galician Golf Federation
- Gold Medal from the Real Aero Club of Santiago
- Gold Medal from the Manises Golf Club
- Ladder of Success by the Tomelloso Golf Club
