= Spanish International Amateur Championship =

Tournament information
- Location: Spain
- Established: 1911
- Course: Rotating
- Organised by: Royal Spanish Golf Federation
- Format: Match play
- Month played: March

Current champion
- (England) Tom Osborne

The Spanish International Amateur Championship (Copa S.M. el Rey) is an annual amateur golf tournament in Spain for men. Founded in 1911, it is one of the oldest and most prestigious amateur championships in Europe.

Prior to 2020 it was an "A" rated tournament in the World Amateur Golf Ranking. (The calculation of the ranking changed in 2020 and there were no longer any categories.) The tournament has been appointed as a qualifying event for the European teams in the Junior Ryder Cup.

The tournament begins with 36 holes of stroke play, were the best placed players qualify for a following match play competition. In 2020, the 32 best players qualified for the match-play.

Every year the tournament has taken place, except in 1914, 1949 and 1955, the Spanish International Ladies Amateur Championship has also been played. Until 1985, it was on the same course as the men's tournament.

Finalists that have gone on to win a major or play Ryder Cup include José María Olazábal, Sergio García, Darren Clarke, Danny Willett, Edoardo Molinari and Tommy Fleetwood.

== Winners ==
Year	Venue	Champion	Score	Runner-up	Ref
2026	Puerta de Hierro	(England) Tom Osborne	3 & 2	(England) Eliot Baker	
2025	Guadalhorce	(France) Hugo Le Goff	5 & 3	(Italy) Filippo Ponzano	
2024	Alcanada	(Netherlands) Lars van der Vight	(Note: Van der Vight won with a 3-stroke margin at 282 (−6) after the championship was changed to a 72-hole stroke play format due to inclement weather)	(Spain) Luis Masaveu	
2023	Infinitum	(Switzerland) Nicola Gerhardsen	1 up	(Sweden) Albert Hansson	
2022	Sherry Golf Jerez	(England) John Gough	6 & 5	(Norway) Michael Mjaaseth	
2021	RCG El Prat	(Italy) Lucas Nicolas Fallotico	1 up	(France) Paul Margolis	
2020	RCG de Sevilla	(Spain) José Luis Ballester	3 & 1	(Germany) Jannik de Bruyn	
2019	Las Colinas	(Netherlands) Koen Kouwenaar	2 & 1	(England) Callum Farr	
2018	La Manga	(England) Billy McKenzie	3 & 2	(England) Alex Fitzpatrick	
2017	El Saler	(Wales) Jack Davidson	4 & 3	(England) Marco Penge	
2016	RCG de Sevilla	(France) Romain Langasque	9 & 8	(England) Scott Gregory	
2015	Sherry	(Netherlands) Jeroen Krietenmeijer	1 up	(Republic of Ireland) Gary Hurley	
2014	La Reserva	(Spain) Daniel Berná	3 & 2	(Austria) Robin Goger	
2013	La Manga	(Northern Ireland) Reeve Whitson	4 & 3	(England) Neil Raymond	
2012	Alcanada	(England) Jack Hiluta	4 & 3	(Germany) Marcel Schneider	
2011	RCG El Prat	(England) Laurie Canter	11 & 10	(England) Stiggy Hodgson	
2010	La Canada	(England) Matt Haines	37 holes	(England) Tommy Fleetwood	
2009	RCG de Sevilla	(Netherlands) Reinier Saxton	2 & 1	(England) Sam Hutsby	
2008	Pals	(England) Danny Willett	5 & 3	(Spain) Jordi García Pinto	
2007	Desert Springs	(England) John Parry	10 & 9	(France) Baptiste Chapellan	
2006	Sherry Golf	(England) Sam Hutsby	7 & 6	(Italy) Edoardo Molinari	
2005	El Saler	(Netherlands) Joost Luiten	3 & 2	(England) Neil Chaudhuri	
2004	Desert Springs	(Iceland) Heiðar Davíð Bragason	3 & 2	(Spain) Sebastián García Grout	
2003	Costa Ballena	(Spain) Gonzalo Fernández-Castaño	4 & 3	(Spain) Álvaro Quirós	
2002	Costa Ballena	(England) Zane Scotland	4 & 3	(Finland) Thomas Sundström	
2001	PGA Golf	(England) Tom Whitehouse	8 & 6	(Italy) Edoardo Molinari	
2000	RCG El Prat	(England) Richard Finch	4 & 3	(Spain) Roger Albiñana	
1999	Sevilla	(France) Olivier David		(Finland) Mikko Ilonen	
1998	RCG El Prat	(Spain) Sergio García	5 & 4	(France) Jérôme Bourg	
1997	Sevilla	(Netherlands) Maarten Lafeber	4 & 3	(Spain) Sergio García	
1996	La Manga	(Spain) José Manuel Lara	6 & 5	(Norway) Henrik Bjørnstad	
1995	Málaga	B. Moir	4 & 3	(Spain) José María Zamora	
1994	Pals	(England) James Healey	1 up	(Denmark) Thomas Havemann	
1993	Valderama	(France) Fabrice Stolear	293	(Spain) Erjord Knuth	
1992	RCG El Prat	(England) Matt Stanford	1 up	(Belgium) Nicolas Vanhootegem	
1991	Las Palmas	(Spain) Tomás Jesús Muñoz	2 & 1	(Spain) Ignacio Garrido	
1990	El Saler	(Northern Ireland) Darren Clarke	7 & 5	(Germany) Sven Strüver	
1989	Las Brisas	(France) Éric Giraud	3 & 2	(Spain) Jesús María Arruti	
1988	Vallromanes	(Sweden) Stephen Lindskog	8 & 7	(England) Simon Walker	
1987	Aloha	(Republic of Ireland) Michael Quirke	8 & 6	(Sweden) Olle Karlsson	
1986	El Saler	(Sweden) Anders Haglund	8 & 6	(France) Laurent Lassalle	
1985	Las Brisas	(Spain) Borja Queipo de Llano	4 & 3	(England) Craig Laurence	
1984	RCG El Prat	(Spain) José María Olazábal	6 & 5	(Spain) Román Tayá	
1983	Sotogrande	(Spain) José María Olazábal	6 & 5	(Spain) Alejo Ollé	
1982	Santa Ponsa	Doug Williams	3 & 2	(Northern Ireland) Michael Malone	
1981	Torrequebrada	(Republic of Ireland) Philip Walton	3 & 2	(Spain) Jesús López Moreno	
1980	El Saler	(France) François Illouz	2 & 1	(Spain) Alfonso Montojo	
1979	Sotogrande	(Spain) Román Tayá	3 & 2	(England) Toby Shannon	
1978	RCG El Prat	(Spain) Nicasio Sagardía	4 & 3	(Sweden) Per Andersson	
1977	Sotogrande	(Spain) Santiago Fernández	1 up	(Spain) Román Tayá	
1976	Aloha	(France) George Leven	2 & 1	(Spain) José Gancedo	
1975	Las Brisas	(France) Sven Boinet	2 & 1	(Sweden) Hans Hedjerson	
1974	Atalaya	(Sweden) Hans Hedjerson	4 & 3	(Sweden) Michael Örtegren	
1973	Sotogrande	(Sweden) Hans Hedjerson	3 & 1	(England) Stephen Bonham	
1972	Málaga	(England) Stephen Bonham	37 holes	(Spain) José Gancedo	
1971	Pedreña	(Spain) Eduardo de la Riva Casanueva	4 & 3	J. A. Cartwight	
1970	Pals	(Spain) Eduardo de la Riva Casanueva	2 & 1	(New Zealand) Stuart Jones	
1969	Club de Campo	(Spain) José Gancedo	10 & 9	(Spain) Duke of Fernán-Núñez	
1968	Río Real	(Spain) José Gancedo	1 up	Anthony Howard	
1967	Neguri	Anthony Howard	9 & 7	(Spain) Santiago Fernández	
1966	RCG El Prat	(Spain) Francisco Sanchiz	5 & 4	(Spain) Juan Antonio Andreu	
1965	Puerta de Hierro	(Spain) Luis Alvarez de Bohorques	7 & 5	(England) Dru Montagu	
1964	Club de Campo	(England) Dru Montagu		(Spain) Alvaro Muro	
1963	RCG El Prat	(Spain) Francisco Sanchiz	7 & 6	(Spain) José Gancedo	
1962	Puerta de Hierro	(Spain) Alvaro Muro	5 & 4	(England) M. Youd	
1961	Club de Campo	(Spain) Duke of Fernán-Núñez		(Scotland) Robin Galloway	
1960	RCG El Prat	(Spain) Iván Maura		(Spain) Luis Rezola	
1959	Puerta de Hierro	(Spain) Iván Maura		(Spain) Enrique Muro	
1958	Club de Campo	(Spain) Luis Rezola	3 & 2	(Spain) Juan Antonio Andreu	
1957	RCG El Prat	(Belgium) Jacky Moerman		(United States) Ante Puhalovich	
1956	Puerta de Hierro	(Spain) Iván Maura	5 & 4	(Spain) Enrique Maier	
1955	Puerta de Hierro	(Spain) Duke of Fernán-Núñez		(Spain) Iván Maura	
1954	Puerta de Hierro	(Spain) Iván Maura	9 & 8	(Spain) Enrique Maier	
1953	Puerta de Hierro	Marqués de Cabriñana		(Spain) Luis Rezola	
1952	Puerta de Hierro	(France) Henri de Lamaze		(Spain) Luis Rezola	
1951	Puerta de Hierro	(France) Henri de Lamaze		Marqués de Cabriñana	
1950	Puerta de Hierro	(France) Henri de Lamaze		(France) Jacques Léglise	
1949	Pedreña	(Spain) Luis Ignacio de Arana		Enrique Fernández Villaverde	
1948	Puerta de Hierro	Vizconde de Llantero		J. Muro O'Shea	
1947	Pedreña	(Spain) Luis Ignacio de Arana		(Spain) Eugenio Machado	
1946	Puerta de Hierro	(United States) William L. Shea		(Spain) Marqués de Viluma	
1945	San Cugat	(Spain) Augusto Batlló		(Sweden) Nils Odqvist	
1944	Puerta de Hierro	(Spain) Marqués de Sobroso		(Spain) Santiago Ugarte	
1943	Pedreña	Vizconde de Llantero		Alfredo Pla	
1942	Puerta de Hierro	Vizconde de Pereira Machado		Alfredo Pla	
1941	Pedreña	(Spain) Luis Ignacio de Arana		(Spain) Javier de Arana	
1936–40	No tournament				
1935	Puerta de Hierro	(Spain) Luis Ignacio de Arana			
1934	Puerta de Hierro	(Spain) Javier de Arana			
1933	Puerta de Hierro	(Spain) Javier de Arana			
1932	Puerta de Hierro	(Spain) Luis Ignacio de Arana			
1931	Puerta de Hierro	Luis Olabarri			
1930	Puerta de Hierro	Conde de Ybarra			
1929	Puerta de Hierro	Pedro Cabeza de Vaca			
1928	Puerta de Hierro	(Spain) Javier de Arana			
1927	Puerta de Hierro	Luis Olabarri			
1926	Puerta de Hierro	Luis Olabarri			
1925	Puerta de Hierro	Ulick de Burgh Charles			
1924	Puerta de Hierro	Pedro Cabeza de Vaca			
1923	Puerta de Hierro	Luis Olabarri			
1922	Puerta de Hierro	Pedro Cabeza de Vaca			
1921	Puerta de Hierro	Emilio Llompart			
1920	Puerta de Hierro	Emilio Llompart			
1919	Puerta de Hierro	José Silva			
1918	Puerta de Hierro	Marqués de la Romana			
1917	Puerta de Hierro	Conde de la Cimera			
1916	Puerta de Hierro	Conde de la Cimera			
1915	Puerta de Hierro	Conde de Cuevas de Vera			
1914	Puerta de Hierro	W. Kennedy			
1913	Madrid Polo Golf	Conde de Cuevas de Vera			
1912	Madrid Polo Golf	Conde O’Byne			
1911	Madrid Polo Golf	Conde de la Cimera			
