= Juan Tomás Gandarias =

Spanish businessman and politician

- Born: Juan Tomás de Gandarias y Durañona; 8 March 1870; Portugalete, Basque Country, Spain
- Died: 17 July 1940 (aged 70); Portugalete, Spain
- Citizenship: Spanish
- Occupations: Businessman; Politician
- Known for: Founder of Altos Hornos de Vizcaya, Banco Urquijo, and Talleres de Guernica
- Political party: Monarchist Action League
- Children: José Gandarias and Pedro Gandarias
- Father: Pedro Pascual Gandarias

Deputy of Spain for Gernika-Lumo
- In office 1896–1914
- Preceded by: Marquis of Lema
- Succeeded by: Eduardo Vincenti y Reguera

Senator of Spain
- In office 1915–1923

Juan Tomás de Gandarias Durañona (8 March 1870 – 17 July 1940) was a Spanish businessman and politician. He founded some of the most important industrial, mining, and financial companies in Spain, such as Altos Hornos de Vizcaya, Banco Urquijo, Talleres de Guernica, and many others; all of which seeded in Biscay. He is thus widely regarded as the fundamental head behind the industrialization and industrial development of Biscay and the Basque Country, being present in practically all sectors, and subsequently in the social identity of those regions from the 20th century onwards.

Even though iron mining was the basis of his industries, he did not hesitate to participate and invest in the new sectors that were beginning to develop in the country, such as metallurgy, banking, chemistry, transportation, telecommunications, and press. His influence was also noted in energy and a sector as important as construction was also not immune to his reach. He participated in numerous boards of directors, presiding over companies such as La Basconia S.A., Talleres de Deusto, Talleres de Guernica, Unión Española de Explosivos, Ferrocarril Amorebieta-Guernica-Pedernales, Coto Teuler, Mina del Morro, and Cementos Pórtland Lemona, and he was also vice president of Banco Urquijo Vascongado and Ferrocarril Bilbao-Portugalete.

He founded the Ibérica Telecommunications Company, the basis of the current Telefónica, and was the owner of not only land and means of transportation, but also of the Bilbao newspaper El Nervión. He also participated, among many others, on the boards of Argentifera de Córdoba, Minas de Alcaracejos, Duro Felguera, Basauri S.A., Electra de Castilla, and of the Basque Railways. As a shareholder he appeared, among others, in companies such as La Papelera Española, Hispano Switzerland de Automobiles, La Construccion Naval, La Robla railway, or banks such as Valencia, Hipotecario, and the Hispano Italiano Trust.

He rejected noble titles, he was named the favorite son of Gernika-Lumo and there are streets named after him in Portugalete, Sestao, and Guernica.

== Early life ==
Juan Tomás Gandarias was born in the Biscayan town of Portugalete in the Basque Country on 8 March 1870, as the first-born son of Pedro Pascual Gandarias (1848–1901), an industrialist and businessman who had participated in and promoted the industrialization of Biscay, and of Victoria Durañona y Santa Coloma, daughter of Juan Durañona, from a family of wealthy iron mining owners. On the same day of the wedding of his parents, Juan Durañona established the creation of the Durañona y Gandarias company, the embryo of a great industrial and mining emporium that was inherited by their first child, Juan Tomás, who also had a marriage of convenience (the so-called policy of links), as he wed Cecilia Urquijo y Ussía, daughter of the Marquess of Urquijo, on 17 May 1900. Nine months later, on 14 February 1901, his father died, so he named his first child, who was born just two days later, after him.

He and his wife had seven children, five sons and two daughters, including Pedro Pascual, Juan Manuel, and José. Like Gandarias, his four younger siblings, three sisters, and a brother, were also related to the Biscayan nobility and bourgeoisie, as did their children. For instance, his sister Casilda married José Joaquín Ampuero, belonging to a Durango family related to the Bank of Bilbao and numerous companies.

As the firstborn of the family, the burden of inheriting the entire family empire had fallen on him, and thus, he did not neglect his education, being reviewed at all times by his father. Gandarias obtained a degree and doctorate in Civil and Canon Law from the Universidad Central de Madrid and completed his training with financial and industrial studies. Upon the death of his father in 1901, he inherited the family business and dedicated his entire professional life to its management. The power of Gandarias' wealth comes obviously from the inheritance he received from his father, but that was only the first step because over the years he demonstrated, with his business, investment, and modernized union, the possibilities that he offered. For instance, even though the origin of the family fortune was iron mining, his businesses and companies covered all industrial and economic sectors as he did not hesitate to participate and invest in other sectors that were beginning to develop in the country.

== Professional career ==
=== Mining ===
Iron mining was the origin of the Gandarias industrial emporium. Iron mines exploded in Biscayan farms in Triano, Ollargan, Somorrostro, and Bilbao. In the mines of Baranbio in Álava, he participated in companies such as Compañía Morro de Bilbao, Coto Teuler, and others. They had the mineral loading site in Olaveaga, in the Nervión estuary. In the coal industry, he was a shareholder in Hulleras de Sabero. And in the lead mines in Córdoba, he participated in companies such as Argentifera de Córdoba, Anglo Vasca, Alcaracejos, and Almadenes.

Gandarias was a promoter of business associations about mining, presiding over the Bilbao Mining Circle, a prominent member of the Biscayan League of Producers, and of the Spanish Mining Union, a representative of the Coastal Chambers of Commerce.

=== Metallurgy ===
The steel industry was a sector that Gandarias took great care of as he dedicated his efforts to creating various companies dedicated to the transformation of metal, espeacilly in Guernica. On behalf of his father and the SA de Metalurgia y Construcciones Vizcaya, he participated in the negotiations for the merger between Altos Hornos de Bilbao and Iberia. Upon the death of his father in 1901, Gandarias took charge of the family businesses, and in the following year, in Bilbao, he participated in the founding of Altos Hornos de Vizcaya, a Spanish metallurgy manufacturing company, which would ultimately be the pillar and the key piece on which he supported all of his businesses and empire, becoming the largest company in Spain for much of the 20th century, employing 40,000 workers at its height.

The main company was Altos Hornos de Vizcaya, but he also participated in Duro Felguera, La Basauri, and in three Spanish Societies of metallurgy: Metallic Constructions (which would later give way to CAF), Evaporation, and Rational Combustion.

=== Banking ===
His business was also directed towards the banking sector, where Gandarias obtained relevant positions in several of them, holding responsibilities in the Banco de Crédito de la Unión Minera, Banco Urquijo Vascongado (vice president), and Banco Urquijo, such as that of a vocal on the board of directors of the latter in 1921 and 1935, with his oldest son Pedro Pascual following his footsteps by becoming a vocal himself in 1944 and 1959 before becoming a vice-president in 1974.

With the help of his brother-in-law and trusted man José Manuel de Arispe, the Marquis of Urquijo, he appeared on the boards of the Banca López Bru and of the Banco Central. As a shareholder, he appeared in the International Credit Society and the Hispano Italiano Trust, as well as in the banks of Valencia, Asturiano, Hipotecario, Burgos, and Comercio, the latter being the depositary of his business.

=== Chemistry ===
Gandarias was present in practically all sectors of industrialization, such as the chemical sector, for the explosives for its mines. He thus participated in the Unión Española de Explosivos (which was later called Unión Explosivos Río Tinto SA and since 1989 Ercros), a Galdakao-based company established to manufacture explosives, becoming considered at the time one of the most important companies in Spain.

He also participated in Patentes Flamma Carbo S.A., La Papelera Española S.A., and the Spanish Coal Distillation Company.

=== Transport ===
In transport, his presence was felt both on land, with his participation in numerous railway companies, on sea, and even in air transport as he promoted companies such as Iberia airline company. As a shareholder, he appeared in companies such as Hispano Switzerland de Automobiles, La Construccion Naval, and La Robla railway.

In land transportation, his influence takes place mainly in the railway, being Vice President of the Bilbao to Portugalete Company and the Amorebieta-Guernica-Pedernales railway company. He also participated in the La Robla railway and on the railways of Vascongados, the base of what is now the Basque Railways. Besides railways, he also promoted Importadora de Neumáticos, a tire Importer that is currently the Firestone Tire and Rubber Company.

In sea transportation, Gandarias participated in the Navigación Vasco Asturiana Company, in charge of transporting coal for Altos Hornos de Vizcaya. By air, he participated in the birth of the Iberia airline company and of Hispano Aviación.

=== Energy, telecommunications, and press ===
Gandarias participated in Electra de Castilla and Hidroeléctrica Ibérica, as well as the Popular Gas and Electricity Company. He also promoted companies such as Refinería de Petróleo de Gijón, an oil refinery in Gijón that later became Campsa.

Gandarias founded the Ibérica Telecommunications Company, the basis of the current Telefónica.

Gandarias was also the owner of the Bilbao newspaper El Nervión.

=== Others ===
In 1913, Gandarias began the industrialization of Guernica, whose mayor Isidoro de León was a man of his trust and manager of a railway he owned, to reach an agreement with the Eibar company Esperanza y Unceta, a weapons manufacturer, to move to Guernica. This company would be followed by many other companies dedicated to metal and cutlery, such as the Los Pirineos dairy industry, but also with Joyería y Platería de Guernica (jewelry and silversmithing), Cerámica de Murueta (ceramic), Española de Cementos Portland, which later become Cementos Pórtland Lemona (cement), and most importantly the Talleres de Guernica (Guernica workshops), which was dedicated to, among other things, the manufacturing of weapons, especially during the First World War. Such was the industrial development that the area acquired international relevance. He presided over companies such as La Basconia S.A. and Talleres de Deusto, where Gandarias invested in their development, both technological and social.

In 1919, Gandarias established the Sociedad Civil Viuda de Pedro Pascual de Ganderas e Hijos, S. C. (Widow Civil Society of Pedro Pascual de Ganderas and sons), as the parent entity of a Holding of companies and businesses belonging to the family. The numerous companies that made up the company were directed by him or by men he trusted, most notably his uncle, José Manuel de Arispe, founder of the Banco de Comercio and director of Banco Bilbao, and Francisco Pérez-Pons, a professor of General and Business Accounting at the School of Higher Commercial Studies of Bilbao.

Gandarias was the president of the National League of Producers, and in 1923, he was a founder of the Federation of National Industries. He also participated in the Asturian Industrial Society and S.A. Aurrerá. He was also an elected member of the Commission for the Protection of National Production.

== Political career ==
However, all these investments in the various sectors of the Spanish economy required political support. From the beginning of his life as a businessman, Gandarias was elected deputy for Gernika-Lumo in 1896. He kept being elected for Gernika continuously until 1914 using dubious methods.

Having a conservative ideology, Gandarias actively participated in politics, being a founding member of the Liberal Union group called "La Piña" (1897), a political union of conservative monarchists and Biscayan industrialists. He was also a founding member of the Conservative Party of Bilbao in 1909.

On 11 May 1915, Gandarias was named Senator for Life by Alfonso XIII. The Certification of Oath took place on 16 May of the following year. He kept this title for eight years until 1923.

In 1919, he was a founding member of the Monarchist Action League, which was dissolved in 1931. This League was a political union that brought together all liberal monarchists, Maurists, conservatives, and independents from Biscay, such as Biscayan industrialists. During the dictatorship of Primo de Rivera, he withdrew from politics as well as during the Second Spanish Republic, except for the specific management he carried out with Indalecio Prieto, with whom he maintained a friendship, to alleviate through public works and subsidies the industrial and employment crisis that took place between 1931 and 1933 in Biscay.

== Sporting career ==
Gandarias owned yawls with which he participated in regatta competitions on the Cantabrian coast. On one occasion, at the beginning of August 1920, he won a regatta in Santander, as the owner of Alai against Giralda V, owned and skippered by Alfonso XIII.

As for football, he was at some point named honorary vice president of the Arenas Club de Getxo, most likely thanks to the influence of his son José, who was the club's president at the time. All of his three oldest children, Pedro, Juan Manuel, and José, played football for the youth teams of Madrid FC, but only the latter made it to the first team, doing it so in a friendly match in 1916, when he was still a child of 12.

== Later life ==
During the Spanish Civil War, Gandarias was twice arrested in Biscay, first on 19 July 1936 in Portugalete, being released just a few days later, and later on 23 August of the same year in Arrazua, being transferred to neighboring Guernica where he was taken to walking through the streets of the town guarded by armed militiamen before being then transferred to Bilbao and released the next day, less than 24 hours after his arrest. Gandarias was able to pay the bail/ransom on both occasions thanks to the efforts of Indalecio Prieto. He was subsequently exiled to Saint-Jean-de-Luz, France, where he lived until the end of the war in 1939.

== Death ==
Gandarias died at his home on the Churruca de Portugalete Pier on 17 July 1940, at the age of 70. In his obituary, the only title that appeared was that of Congregant of Nuestra Señora del Carmen (Congregant of Our Lady of Carmen).

== Legacy ==
Gandarias' economic, industrial, and political power is a clear example of the Biscayan plutocrat. However, unlike his co-religionists, the so-called "steel nobles", he declined the honor of holding noble titles. Despite that, he was still named the favorite son of Gernika-Lumo and there are streets named after him in Portugalete, Sestao, and Guernica.
