= Marquess of Valdueza =

Marquessate of Villanueva de Valdueza
- Creation date: 17 January 1624
- Created by: Philip IV
- Peerage: Peerage of Spain
- First holder: Fadrique Álvarez de Toledo y Mendoza, 1st Marquess of Villanueva de Valdueza
- Present holder: Alonso Álvarez de Toledo y Urquijo, 12th Marquess of Villanueva de Valdueza
- Heir apparent: Sonsoles Álvarez de Toledo y Argüelles

Marquess of Villanueva de Valdueza (Spanish: Marqués de Villanueva de Valdueza), commonly known as Marquess of Valdueza is a hereditary title in the Peerage of Spain granted in 1624 by Philip IV to Fadrique Álvarez de Toledo, an important General of the Spanish Navy who prevented the Dutch conquest of Colonial Brazil. He was son of the 5th Marquess of Villafranca, who was in turn a great-grandchild of Pedro Álvarez de Toledo, 1st viceroy of Naples.

The title gave birth to the eponymous award-winning brand "Marqués de Valdueza", a high-end producer of olive oil, red wine, honey and vinegar managed by the current Marquesses of Valdueza and sold all over the world. Their products are elaborated in the 1,000 acre finca "Perales de Valdueza", one of the two family estates in Mérida, the other being "Azagala", of 17,000 acres in Badajoz, serving mainly as a hunting reserve. It has been praised as "one of the greatest olive oils" by the Financial Times, Vogue, Tatler, Fortnum & Mason, The Guardian and several other institutions.

The Álvarez de Toledo's have been one of the most prominent families in the history of the world, having held more than 80 titles in the peerage of Spain, including the dukedoms of Medina Sidonia, Alba and Infantado. They have produced 2 prime ministers of Spain, colonial governors, distinguished military officers, ecclesiastical figures and even a monarch of Tuscany.

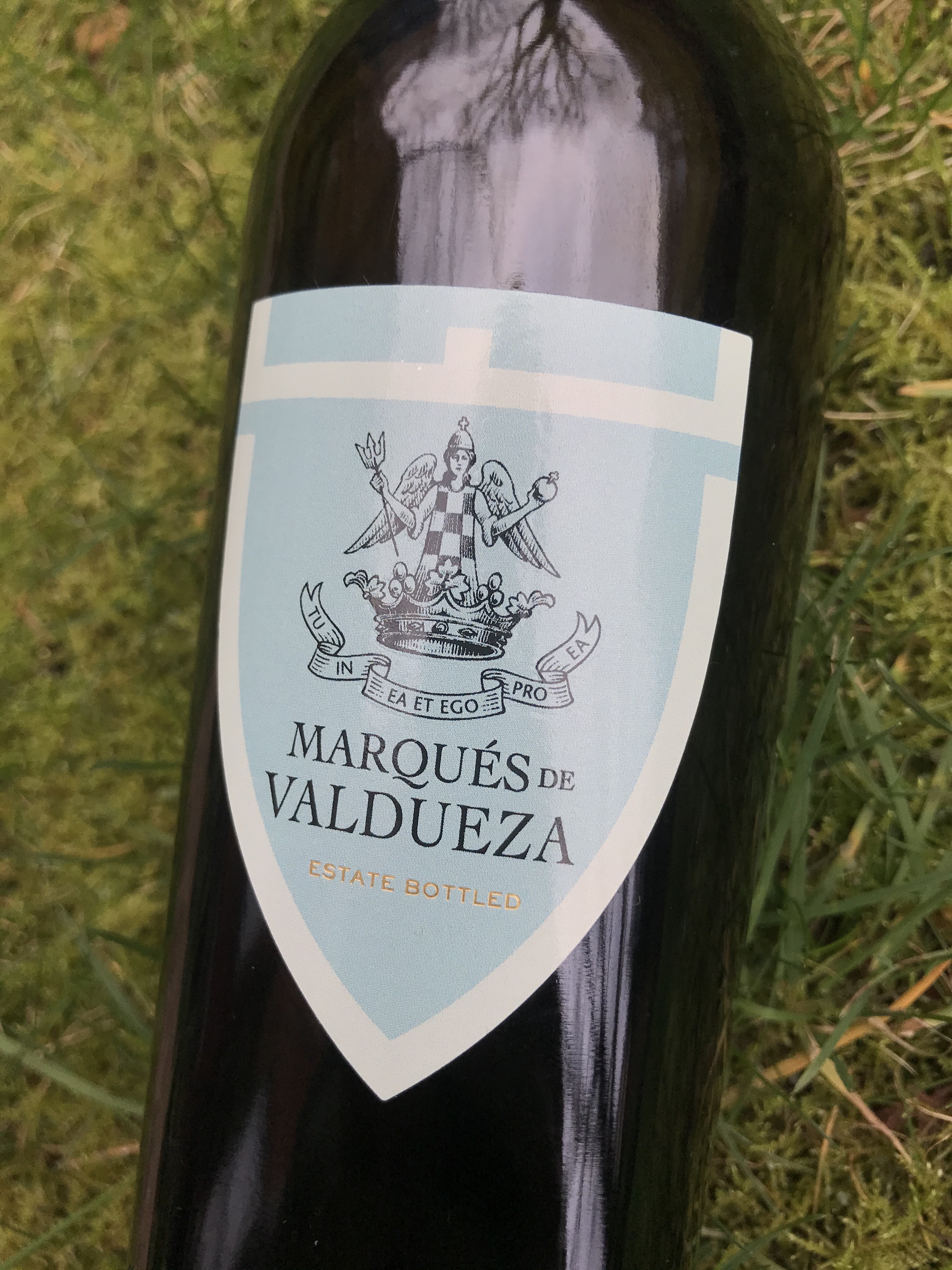
Bottle of "Marqués de Valdueza" olive oil, with ornaments derived from the House of Alba and the motto: tu in ea et ego pro ea (you in her and I for her)

== Marquesses of Villanueva de Valdueza (1624) ==
- Fadrique Álvarez de Toledo y Mendoza, 1st Marquess of Valdueza (1580-1634)
- Fadrique Alvarez de Toledo y Ponce de León, 2nd Marquess of Valdueza (1635-1705), eldest son of the 1st Marquess
- José Fadrique Álvarez de Toledo y Córdoba, 3rd Marquess of Valdueza (1658-1728), eldest son of the 2nd Marquess
- Fadrique Vicente Álvarez de Toledo y Moncada, 4th Marquess of Valdueza (1686-1753), eldest son of the 3rd Marquess
- Antonio Álvarez de Toledo y Pérez de Guzmán, 5th Marquess of Valdueza (1716-1773), eldest son of the 4th Marquess
- José Álvarez de Toledo y Gonzaga, 6th Marquess of Valdueza (1756-1796), eldest son of the 5th Marquess
- Francisco de Borja Álvarez de Toledo y Gonzaga, 7th Marquess of Valdueza (1763-1821), second son of the 5th Marquess
- Pedro Álcantara Alvarez de Toledo y Palafox, 8th Marquess of Valdueza (1803-1867), second son of the 7th Marquess
- Pedro Álvarez de Toledo y Silva, 9th Marquess of Valdueza (1841-1898), third son of the 8th Marquess
- Alonso Álvarez de Toledo y Samaniego, 10th Marquess of Valdueza (1870-1936), third son of Alonso Tomás Álvarez de Toledo y Silva, second son of the 8th Marquess
- Alonso Álvarez de Toledo y Cabeza de Vaca, 11th Marquess of Valdueza (1903-1987), second son of the 10th Marquess
- Alonso Álvarez de Toledo y Urquijo, 12th Marquess of Valdueza (b. 1939), eldest son of the 11th Marquess

The heir apparent to the dukedom is Sonsoles Álvarez de Toledo y Argüelles (b. 1965), eldest daughter of the 12th Marquess.

== See also ==
- List of current grandees of Spain
