= Pedro Pascual Gandarias =

Spanish industrialist and entrepreneur

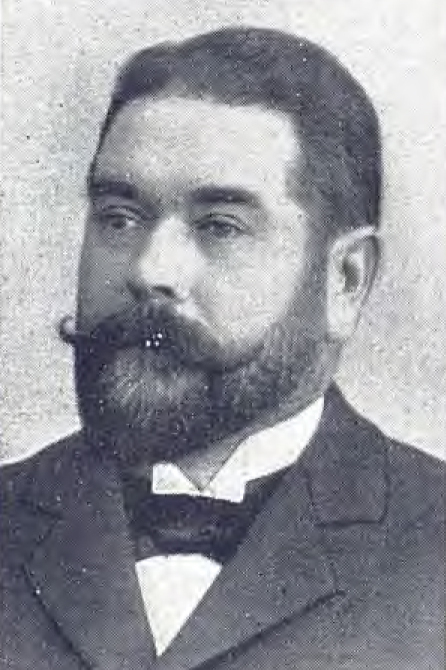
- Born: Pedro Pascual de Gandarias y Navea; 22 October 1843; Arratzu, Basque Country, Spain
- Died: 14 February 1901 (aged 57); Bilbao, Spain
- Citizenship: Spanish
- Occupations: Industrialist; Entrepreneur
- Known for: Founder of Altos Hornos de Vizcaya, Banco Urquijo, and Talleres de Guernica
- Children: Juan Tomás Gandarias

Deputy of Spain for Gernika-Lumo
- In office 1896–1914
- Preceded by: Marquis of Lema
- Succeeded by: Eduardo Vincenti y Reguera

Senator of Spain
- In office 1915–1923

Pedro Pascual de Gandarias Navea (22 October 1843 – 14 February 1901) was a Spanish industrialist and entrepreneur. He was one of the most important figures in the industrial development of Biscay and the Basque Country, being noted for his prominent role in promoting the industrialization of those regions in the 19th century.

He became related by marriage to the Durañona family, an important owner and operator of iron mines, creating the Durañona y Gandarias company, the embryo of a great industrial and mining emporium that was increased by his son Juan Tomás Gandarias.

== Early and personal life ==
Pedro Pascual Gandarias was born in the small Biscayan town of Arratzu, neighboring Gernika-Lumo, in the Basque Country on 22 October 1843, as the sixth child of Juan Tomás de Gandarias Zabala (1808–) and Maria Josefa Navea Altamira, both from Arratzu. His father had a foundry called Huarca in Arratzu and did business with Juan Durañona Arrarte, an important owner and operator of iron mines in the Left Bank area of the Nervión estuary, who supplied the iron to his father's foundry. Their business partnership eventually developed into a friendship, which led to the young Pedro Pascual being sent to Durañona's home in Portugalete to learn the trade of mineral dealer.

On 22 October 1868, the day of his 25th birthday, Gandarias married Durañona's daughter, Victoria (1840–1925). The marriage was financially materialized with the contributions of the couple, with Gandarias contributing three houses in Arrazua and their belongings, estates and mountains, and a flour mill, while Victoria contributed 62 thousand reales. As a result of this, on the same day of the wedding, his father-in-law established the creation of the Durañona y Gandarias company, which would be dedicated to the exploitation of the iron mines that Durañona had in the mountains of Triano, and then, just two years later, in 1870, Durañona gave to Gandarias the power to manage and intervene absolutely in the company's business.

The couple lived in Portugalete until 1870, when they moved to Bilbao, and they had five children: Juan Tomás (1870–1940), Casimira Casilda (1872–1968), Adriana Magdalena (1875), María Victoria (1877), and Ricardo (1880). Gandarias named his first-born after his father, Juan Tomás, and likewise, his son did the exact same thing with his own first-born, which he named after Pedro Pascual, who had died just two days before his birth. His oldest son also had a marriage of convenience (the so-called policy of links), as he wed Cecilia Urquijo y Ussía, daughter of the Marquess of Urquijo, on 17 May 1900. His first daughter Casilda married José Joaquín Ampuero, belonging to a Durango family related to the Banco de Bilbao and numerous companies.

== Professional career ==
=== Metallurgy ===
On 22 September 1882, Gandarias, together with other businessmen and merchants from Biscay, such as Víctor and Benigno Chávarri, José Ángel Olano, Federico Etxebarria, and his brother-in-law Vicente Durañona, founded the SA Metalurgia y Construcciones La Vizcaya. Twenty years later, in 1902, his son Juan Tomás, on behalf of his recently deceased father and the SA de Metalurgia y Construcciones Vizcaya, participated in the negotiations for the merger between Altos Hornos de Bilbao and Iberia. This company, together to Altos Hornos de Bilbao and La Iberia, would be the germ of the future Altos Hornos de Vizcaya.

=== Mining ===
Iron mining was the origin of the Gandarias industrial emporium. Under his leadership, the Durañona y Gandarias company became one of the most important iron ore supply companies in the country for over a decade, from the early 1870s until the early 1880s. In October 1888, however, Juan Durañona denounced Gandarias for undue profits in the management of his companies and took legal action against him. The lawsuit was resolved seven years later, in 1895, when the Supreme Court forced the dissolution of the company after issuing a ruling ordering its liquidation, which required the distribution of the assets.

In 1891 Pedro Pascual Gandarias participated in the founding of Talleres de Deusto SA and in the following year, he was one of the businessmen who founded the tin sheet company SA Basconia in Basauri. The ruling of the lawsuit against his father-in-law gave a strong boost to his companies. He increased the iron mines that he was exploiting, either by buying or leasing wells, extending his activity to other places in the Spanish state, such as Córdoba. He also operates mining companies through companies such as Sociedad Chávarri y Gandarias. Gandarias maintained an average annual production level of iron ore greater than 100 thousand metric tons.

=== Chemistry ===
In 1888, Gandarias participated in the founding of the explosives company Sociedad Anónima Vasco Asturiana which in 1892 became Sociedad Anónima Vasco Andaluza Asturiana to be renamed Sociedad Industrial Asturiana Santa Bárbara, in 1895, and the following year it became the Spanish Union of Explosives. The main production of these companies was gunpowder and dynamite, essential for mining exploitation. As a complement to the steel companies in which Pedro Pascual Gandarias participated, he intervened in the coal sector by participating in the "Sociedad Anónima de Hulleras del Turón".

=== Others ===
Gandarias actively participated in many other companies such as the Bilbao-Portugalete Railway Company, Sociedad Anónima Alcaracejos, Argentifera de Córdoba, Sociedad Anónima Los Almadenes or the Anglo-Basque Society of the Mines of Córdoba. In 1889 he gave powers to his brother-in-law José Manuel de Arispe y Acaiturri through which he intervened in the founding of the Banco del Comercio in 1891 and participated as a director in the Banco de Bilbao in 1901.

=== Tourism ===
Gandarias was a pioneer and promoter of the use of natural and landscape wealth, as well as the possibilities and resources tourism that the region of Busturialdea and the Guerniquesado (Note: Guernica and its surrounding areas.) in general promised. In this propitiatory framework, Gandarias, always attentive to the opportunities offered by the market and who had a great sensitivity to accumulation, maximization of profits, reinvestment and profit, landed in the region of the Guerniquesado with the acquisition of a large number of hamlets, mountains and various estates when purchasing from the properties that Eugénie de Montijo put up for sale.

In 1885, Gandarias was a minority shareholder at the time of the founding of Amorebieta to Guernica Railway Company, SA, but eventually he became its president in 1893. Under his leadership, he extended the line to the coastal town of Pedernales in the island of Chacharramendi which, in a pioneering way, caused the beginning of the hotel and restaurant business in that with the establishment of a hotel, called Hotel Chacharramendi in 1896.

=== Oyster farming ===
The vertical integration of Gandarias' businesses meant that in order to supply certain provisions to his hotel in Pedernales, he urged his brother-in-law Arispe, to buy oyster farms in the region, initially to supply the precious mollusk to his hotel in Pedernales. Arispe's negotiations were carried out with Gregorio Orueta y Gorriño and Pedro Allendesalazar y Zulueta, both of whom began acting as frontmen for Gandarias.

On 9 December 1897, Orueta acquired the property of the "Echandia" mill and its belongings on behalf of Gandarias and three other businessmen from Gernika-Lumo, who provided him with the necessary capital, eleven thousand pesetas, to carry out the purchase operation, and then in the following year, on 26 November 1898, these four men and Orueta appeared in Pedernales (possibly at the Hotel Chacharramendi) before the notary of the Guernica District, José de Mendieta, to assign and transfer the Echandia mill to their favor, with Orueta renouncing all rights to said property, so that they could freely dispose of both the mill and its dam in order to allocate it to what they believed most convenient to their interests, which was its exploitation as a park for oyster farming. Therefore, they founded the Company Ostrícola de canala, SA on that same day, which was registered in the Commercial Registry of Biscay on 12 January 1899, with its corporate purpose being the exploitation of the mill and its dam, establishing an oyster farm and a fishing farm there; Gandarias was the owner of 56 shares, for an amount of 14,000 pesetas. Gandarias was then elected as the company's first president, with the rest of the shareholders, as well as the different administrative positions of the company, were people closely linked to Gandarias, either through personal or political friendship or as administrators of his considerable assets. The company lasted 37 years until the outbreak of the Spanish Civil War in 1936.

In his desire to carry out the installation of an aquaculture industry for oyster farming, Gandarias once again used an intermediary to obtain his goal, Allendesalazar, who achieved a concession of a public maritime-terrestrial domain (floodable land) on the bank of the Urdaibai estuary at the end of 1898, but he never used it because, on 27 October 1898, he assigned the oyster farm with all the rights and uses inherent there in favor of Gandarias, represented by Arispe, who did as attorney-in-fact of Gandarias. With the obtaining of this concession and together with the Echandia mill and its dam, Gandarias achieved his goal of establishing an oyster farming industry.

== Politic career ==
Just like his friend Víctor Chávarri, Gandarias was politically liberal and he opted for free trade although he later preferred protectionism. Politically he was not active, participating only in the town council of Portugalete before 1874.

== Social life ==
Pedro Pascual Gandarias was part of the Biscayan plutocracy of the 19th century. He is one of the founders of the "Bilbao Chamber of Commerce, Industry and Navigation" on 28 May 1886. He was a promoter of the Círculo Minero de Bilbao participating in its foundation in 1886. He was vice president of the "Vizcayan League of Producers" and then its president in 1900 as well as a member of the board of works of the Port of Bilbao where he had a large mineral loading dock at the Olaveaga dock.

== Death ==
Gandarias died at his home in Bilbao on 14 February 1901, at the age of 58, and just two days later, his first grandson was born, which was accordingly named after him. He is buried in his hometown, in Arrazua, in a pantheon made by the sculptor Nemesio de Mogrovejo. An obituary note said "One of the most powerful elements that have contributed to the prosperity and aggrandizement of Vizcaya".

== Legacy ==
Upon the death of his father in 1901, his oldest son Juan Tomás took charge of the family businesses, and in the following year, in Bilbao, he participated in the founding of Altos Hornos de Vizcaya, a Spanish metallurgy manufacturing company, which would ultimately be the pillar and the key piece on which he supported all of his businesses and empire, becoming the largest company in Spain for much of the 20th century, employing 40,000 workers at its height.

Gandarias was named Knight of the Grand Cross of Isabel la Católica. In 1919, his oldest son Juan Tomás established the Sociedad Civil Viuda de Pedro Pascual de Ganderas e Hijos, S. C. (Civil Society of the Widow of Pedro Pascual de Ganderas and sons), as the parent entity of a Holding of companies and businesses belonging to the family.
