= Fadrique de Toledo, 1st Marquess of Valdueza =

Spanish Navy officer and nobleman (1580–1634)

The Marquess of Valdueza
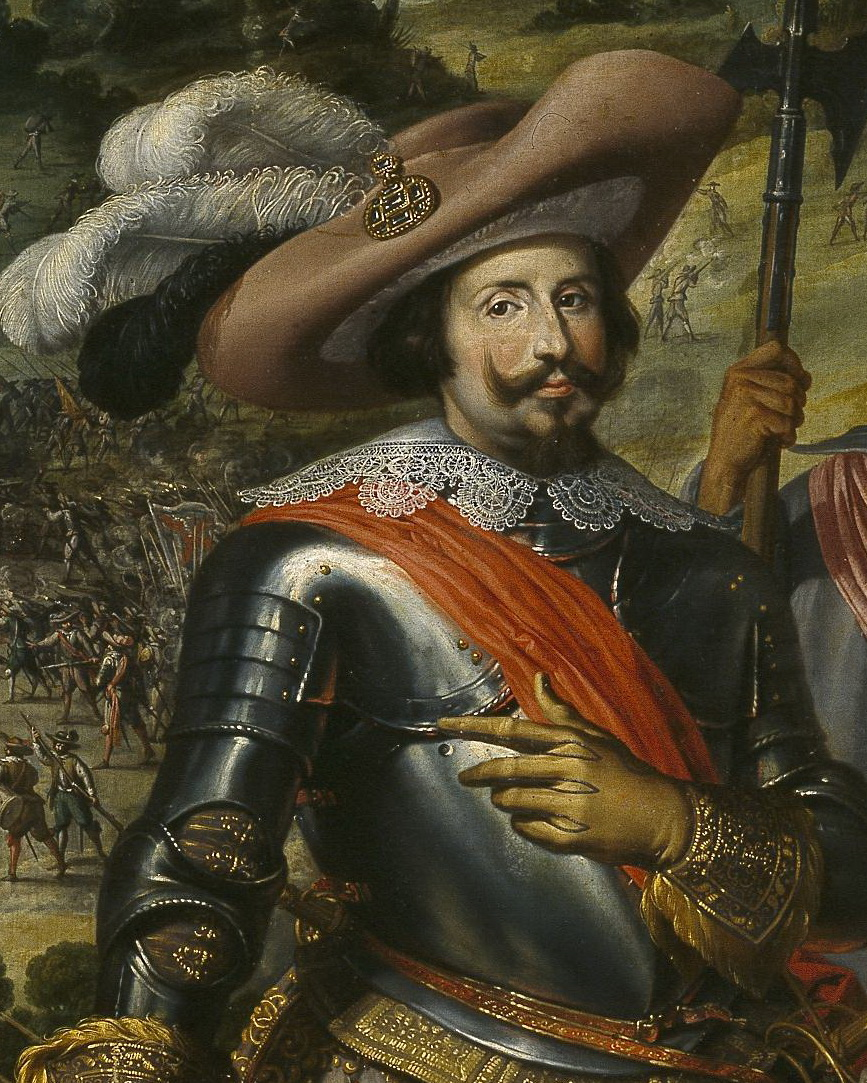
- Detail of the work on canvas The Recovery of the Island of Saint Kitts (1634), Museo del Prado, Madrid, by painter Félix Castello (1595–1651), showing the portrait of Fadrique de Toledo
- Full name: Fadrique Álvarez de Toledo-Osorio y Hurtado de Mendoza
- Born: 30 May 1580; Naples, Kingdom of Naples, Spanish Italy (present-day Italy)
- Died: 11 December 1634 (aged 54); Madrid, Spain
- Noble family: House of Toledo
- Spouse: Elvira Ponce de León y Toledo y Mendoza (m. 1627)
- Issue others...: Fadrique Alvarez de Toledo-Osorio y Ponce de León, 7th Marquess of Villafranca
- Father: Pedro Álvarez de Toledo-Osorio y Colonna, 5th Marquess of Villafranca
- Mother: Elvira de Mendoza y Mendoza

Military service
- Allegiance: Spanish Empire
- Branch/service: Spanish Navy
- Years of service: c. 1600–1634
- Rank: Captain general
- Commands: Armada del Mar Océano; Gente de Guerra of the Kingdom of Portugal
- Battles/wars: War against Barbary pirates; Eighty Years' War; Battle of Gibraltar (1621); Recapture of Bahia; Anglo-Spanish War (1625–1630); Capture of Saint Kitts and Nevis (1629)

Fadrique de Toledo Osorio, 1st Marquess of Valdueza (30 May 1580 – 11 December 1634), was a Spanish Navy officer and nobleman. Like his brother García, he was a Knight of the Order of Santiago and became Captain General of the Spanish Navy.

== Life ==
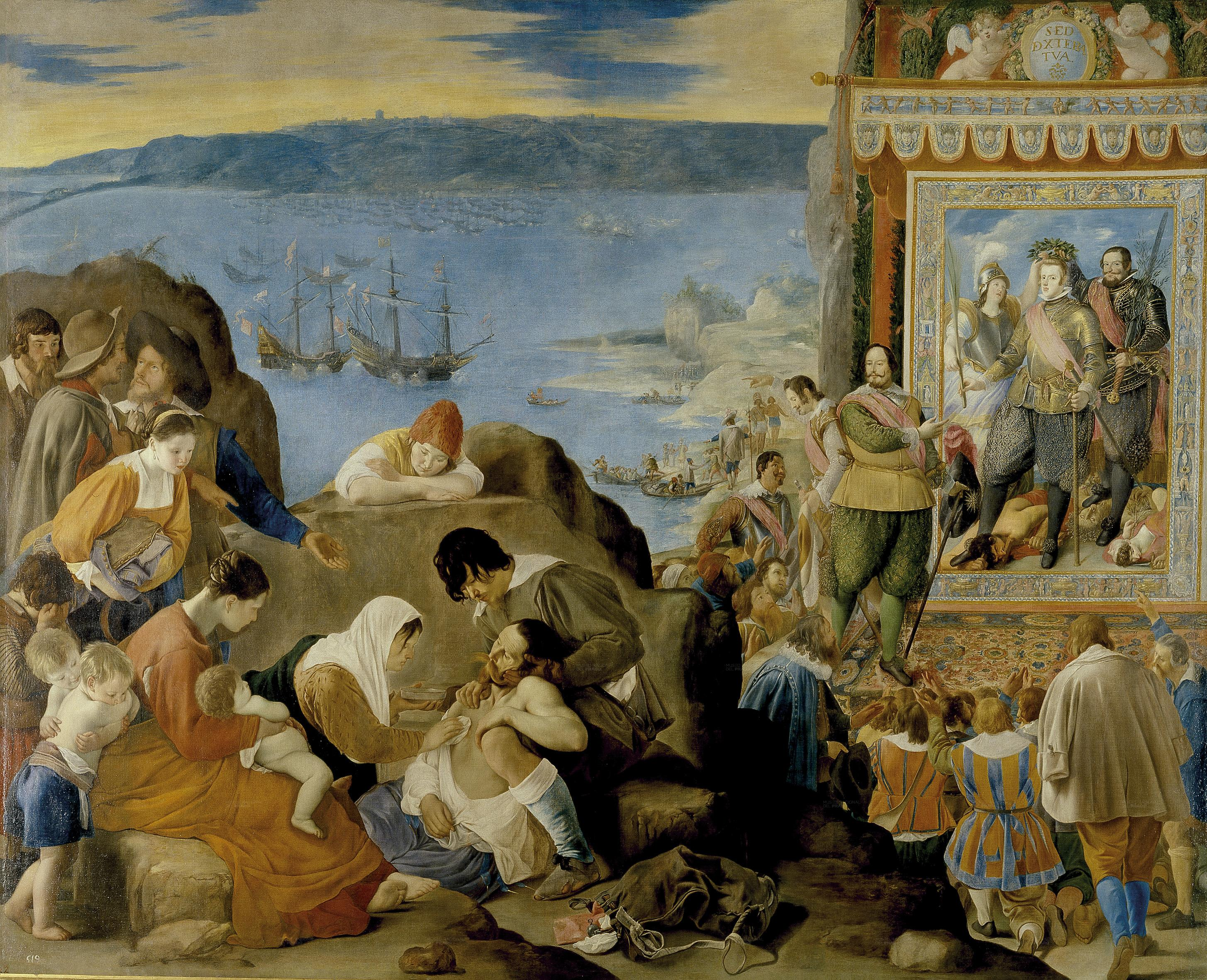
The recuperation of 1 May 1625 of the Brazilian Portuguese town of Salvador de Bahia by Spanish and Portuguese troops commanded by Captain General of the Fleet Fadrique II de Toledo Osorio y Mendoza, a painting by Fray Juan Bautista Maíno for King Philip IV of Spain, Philip III of Portugal. Museo del Prado, Madrid, Spain. Don Fadrique II is the big "en bonpoint" nobleman presenting it to King Philip IV and Prime Minister Gaspar de Guzmán, Count-Duke of Olivares

He was born in Naples as the son of Pedro de Toledo Osorio, 5th Marquess of Villafranca, then commander in chief of the Spanish Army in the Kingdom of Naples, and Doña Elvira de Mendoza.

He served in the Spanish fleet under command of his father and rose quickly through the ranks, as did his elder brother García de Toledo Osorio, 6th Marquess of Villafranca. In 1617, he became Captain General of the Ocean Sea Navy, replacing the late Admiral Luis Fajardo.

He gained several victories against the Dutch, in 1621 near Gibraltar and in 1623 in the English Channel, blockading the Dutch coast. In the same year he defeated a Moorish incursion near Gibraltar.

For all of his victories he was awarded the title of Marquess of Villanueva de Valdueza on 17 January 1624.

In 1625 he was appointed General of Portugal (then in a personal union with Spain), and Capitán General of the Army of Brazil. He sailed towards Brazil at the head of a fleet consisting of 34 Spanish ships, 22 Portuguese ships and 12,566 men (three quarters were Spanish and the rest Portuguese). There he reconquered the strategically important city of Salvador da Bahia from the Dutch on 30 April 1625. This victory would prove decisively important in the Dutch-Portuguese War to oust the Dutch from Brazil over the next two decades.

In 1629 he commanded a Spanish expedition that expelled the English and French colonial settlers from the islands of Saint Kitts and Nevis.

== Marriage and children ==
On 12 August 1627, in Madrid, Don Fadrique married his cousin Doña Elvira Ponce de León, daughter of Don Luis Ponce de León, VI Marqués de Zahara, and Doña Victoria Álvarez de Toledo.

They had three children :

- Doña Elvira de Toledo, married Don Juan Gaspar Enríquez de Cabrera, 6th Duke of Medina de Rioseco.
- Doña Victoria de Toledo, married her cousin Don Francisco Ponce de León, 5th Duke of Arcos.
- Don Fadrique Alvarez de Toledo y Ponce de León, 2nd Marquess of Valdueza, 7th Marquess de Villafranca and Grandee of Spain.

Don Fadrique also had two illegitimate children:

- Pedro Álvarez de Toledo, Abbot of the Royal Monastery of Alcalá la Real, Jaén.
- Íñigo de Toledo, who married Leonor de Velasco, XI Countess of Siruela.
