= José Gandarias =

Spanish footballer

Personal information
- Full name: José Gandarias Urquijo
- Date of birth: 20 March 1904
- Place of birth: Madrid, Spain
- Date of death: 2 February 1979 (aged 74)
- Place of death: Madrid, Spain
- Position: Right winger

Youth career
- Madrid FC

Senior career*
Years	Team	Apps	(Gls)
1916	Madrid FC	1	(0)
1925–1926	Arenas Club de Getxo		
President of Arenas Club de Getxo
In office 1926–1929
Preceded by	Luis Lazúrtegui
Succeeded by	Juan Manuel Gandarias
Vice-president of the Biscayan Hockey Federation
- * Club domestic league appearances and goals

José Gandarias Urquijo (20 March 1904 – 2 February 1979) was a Spanish footballer who played for Arenas Club de Getxo before becoming its president in the late 1920s. Under his presidency, the team was the 1927 Copa del Rey runners-up, but he is best known for being the youngest-ever first-team player in the history of Real Madrid, which he achieved in a friendly in 1916, when he was still a child of 12.

Apart from football, he also practiced regattas, becoming champion of several competitions and founding the Real Club Náutico de Madrid. He had a stable of racehorses and was the person who brought Claudio Carudel to Spain. He also dedicated himself to motorcycling and golf.

== Early and personal life ==
Gandarias was born on 20 March 1904 in Madrid, as the son of Juan Tomás Gandarias y Durañona, a businessman from Biscay (1870–1940), and Cecilia Urquijo y Ussía, daughter of the Marquess of Urquijo. He was the third of seven children, five sons and two daughters, including two older brothers, Pedro Pascual and Juan Manuel.

He lived most of his life in Getxo with his wife Carmen de Lozano Ugalde, with whom he had eight children, all born in Getxo: Carmen (1925), Pilar (1926), Isabel (1929), Paloma (1930), Almudena, Alfonso, Rocío and Yolanda de Gandarias Lozano.

== Playing career ==
=== Debuting for Madrid at 12 ===
From the beginning of the 20th century until the national league was formed in 1929, the clubs used to organize friendlies between themselves to fill up the calendar, and as such, in December 1916, Madrid FC arranged two friendly matches with Deportivo de La Coruña and a third with Deportivo Auténtico, a team formed from a split of the former club. This meeting, which took place at the Campo de O'Donnell on 17 December, did not have much impact on the press of the time, so the only chronicle of that match was published by Madrid Sport, a magazine prepared by several members of Madrid FC, which stated that "Gandarias, a little boy from Infantil, replaced Bilbao in the second half, and despite never having played on the outside left, he performed quite well".

The Gandarias brothers, Pedro aged 15, Juan Manuel aged 14, and José aged 12, had all played football for Madrid's youth team, but only one of them made it to the first team, with most investigations and historians agreeing that the identity of this Gandarias most likely belongs to José since "a little boy" from the Infantil team is closer to a 12-year-old child, whether small or younger, than to one of 14 or 15. In fact, just two months prior, on 22 October 1916, José featured in a match for Madrid Infantil against a combination of players from the 3rd and 4th teams of Racing de Madrid, being the only one of the brothers to do so. Furthermore, the note from Madrid Sport states that Gandarias had never played "outside left", and although none of the brothers had played on the left wing in the revised lineups, Juan Manuel has been identified as a defender, Pedro as a midfielder, and José as a right winger, thus the latter is once again the one who best adapts to the chroniclers of the time. Therefore, at the age of 12 years and 272 days, Gandarias is the youngest-ever first-team player in the history of Real Madrid, albeit not in an official match.

Two months later, in February 1917, Gandarias featured in a match between club veterans and club youth players, playing for the latter side alongside established players from the first team, such as Ricardo Álvarez, Sotero Aranguren, and Eduardo Teus, thus making it clear that he was being considered by most first team members as a player of the future. In the issue of Madrid Sport of 1 March 1917, on the occasion of a children's championship match against Recreativo Español in Madrid, Pedro Termens, a sports journalist, warned Español's team captain about José's abuse of his strong muscles, stating that he "uses them excessively against his opponents". This warning suggests that the 12-year-old Gandarias was already quite strong and physically developed at the time, which explains why he was being selected to play in first team matches at such a young age.

=== Arenas Club de Getxo ===
Gandarias played his last season as a footballer for Arenas Club de Getxo in 1925–26. At the Ordinary Meeting of June of that year, Gandarias was elected president of the club, aged only 22, replacing Luis Lazúrtegui who had left that position. He held the Arenas presidency for three seasons, from 1926 to 1929, and under his presidency, the team reached the final of the 1927 Copa del Rey, which ended in a 0–1 loss to Real Unión. On 13 November 1927, on the occasion of the Zugatzarte F.C. festivities, Gandarias donated a trophy to the winners of a match between Arenas Club and the Acero Club Olaveagaon played at the Campo de Ibaiondo; Arenas won 2–1.

In 1928, the vice president of Arenas, José María Acha, played a crucial role in organizing the first national tournament for professional clubs in Spain, Torneo de Campeones, the forerunner for La Liga, which began a year later, so Gandarias, as the president of Arenas during this period, had a small contribution to the birth of the Spanish top division league. He was also vice president of the Biscayan Hockey Federation representing the Arenas, since he was president of this last.

During his presidency of Arenas, his older brother Juan Manuel served as a member of the board of directors chaired by Juan Antonio Aznar Zabala. Gandarias' father was at some point named honorary vice president of the Arenas Club, most likely thanks to José's influence. He was replaced as president by Juan Manuel, who held this position until the end of the 1930–31 season.

== Later life ==
In addition to football, Gandarias also practiced regattas, becoming champion of several competitions and being among the founders of the Real Club Náutico de Madrid in 1958. He was a member of the club's first Board of Directors as one of its vocals alongside the likes of the then Duke of Veragua, Duke of Alba, and Duke of Arión.

In 1967, he gave an interview on equestrian themes to the Marca newspaper.

In his professional life, Gandarias became the director of Altos Hornos de Vizcaya, which had been founded by his father to industrialize the Guernica area. He also directed some of his father's companies dedicated to metal.

== Death ==
Gandarias died in Madrid on 2 February 1979, at the age of 74.
