= Assassination of the Marquesses of Urquijo =

1980 murder in Madrid, Spain

The Spanish nobles María Lourdes de Urquijo, 5th Marchioness of Urquijo and Grandee of Spain, and her husband Manuel de la Sierra, were murdered in their Madrid home on 1 August 1980. Their son-in-law Rafael Escobedo was convicted of the crime, and later committed suicide in prison. Escobedo's friend Javier Anastasio de Espona fled before being brought to trial, but much later asserted his innocence.

== Events ==
During the night of 1 August 1980, the Marquesses of Urquijo were shot to death, while they slept at their palace in Somosaguas near Madrid. The Marquess was owner of Banco Urquijo, whose shares were plummeting at the time.

The main suspect, and the only person convicted for the crime, was Rafael Escobedo (1955–1988). He had married Miriam de la Sierra y Urquijo, daughter of the Marquesses, on 21 June 1978. The relationship deteriorated and in 1979 Miriam formed a relationship with Richard Dennis Rew, known as "Dick the American". The day after the murder, Javier Anastasio de Espona, a friend of Escobedo, and Diego Martínez Herrera, butler to the Urquijos, separately travelled in haste to London, where Juan, the son of the Marquesses and Miriam's younger brother, was living.

The police sustained that the murder weapon was a rare .22 caliber model made by Star Bonifacio Echeverria in Éibar, which had been used by Escobedo in shooting competitions, but which his father stated had been sold two months before the killing. The prosecution stated in court that bullet casings found at the country house of the Escobedo's had markings which matched the four found at the scene of the crime. Escobedo was arrested on the 8th of April 1981 and signed a confession, as well as giving a verbal confession, both of which he would retract. Escobedo's pistol was later located by the authorities in a marsh, to which they had been directed by Javier Anastasio de Espona, who said he had been instructed to hide it there by Escobedo. The weapon then disappeared from the police station.

The disappearance of the cartridges found at the crime scene, while in the care of the police, further complicated the progress of Escobedo's trial. Escobedo was tried as sole defendant, with the ballistic evidence based on the disappeared shell casings presented alongside the two retracted confessions (one of which had disappeared in police custody) which Escobedo said had been extracted by threats to arrest and charge his parents. In July 1983, Escobedo was found guilty and sentenced to 53 years in prison, and the sentence was confirmed by the Supreme Court of Spain in 1985.

=== Death of Escobedo ===
Escobedo maintained his innocence, accusing Anastasio of the crime, until his death in the prison of El Dueso on 27 July 1988. Escobedo's body was found hanged in his cell, attached by a torn sheet to the bars of the window. No suicide note was present. A doctor hired by the deceased's lawyer found no evidence of the normal physiological symptoms of hanging. High levels of cyanide were found in Escobedo's lungs, consistent with inhalation. Escobedo had become a user of various types of drugs in prison.

=== Escape of Anastasio ===
Anastasio had been detained in January 1983 and his trial as participant in the murder was set for 21 January 1988. However, a month before the trial he escaped to Brazil via Portugal, and since then his whereabouts have been unknown.

The only sighting of him was seven years afterwards, when he was interviewed for television by Jesús Quintero in Brazil. In May 2010 the charges against him were withdrawn and the case was closed under the statute of limitations, 30 years having passed since the crime.

In 2010 Anastasio was interviewed for the first time for the magazine Vanity Fair in Buenos Aires. He denied having committed the crime.

=== Conviction of López-Roberts ===
In February 1990, Mauricio López-Roberts y Melgar, Marquess of Torrehermosa, was sentenced to ten years in prison for obstruction of justice. This related to his funding of Javier Anastasio's voyage to London on the night of the murder, and his refusal to reveal information about the involvement of Anastasio and Escobedo in the murder, which the court found he must have.

== Repercussions ==
The Spanish media have accorded this murder more coverage than most other crime stories of any period. Hundreds of pages of press coverage appeared after the murder, during the trial, and after the suicide of the convict. Several books have been published about the case, among them Con un crimen al hombro. Yo maté a los marqueses de Urquijo ("With a crime on my shoulder: I killed the Marquesses of Urquijo": 1994), a biography of Escobedo by Matías Antolín, a personal friend.

The case also inspired the film Solo o en compañía de otros ("Alone or in company": 1991), with Juan Ribó and Ana Álvarez, and the episode The crime of the Marquesses of Urquijo (2010) in the television series La huella del crimen, on Televisión Española.
