= Fadrique Alvarez de Toledo y Ponce de León =

Spanish noble, military figure and politician

General Fadrique de Toledo Osorio 2nd Marquess of Valdueza 7th Marquess of Villafranca del Bierzo 4th Duke of Fernandina 4th Prince of Montalbán 7th Count of Peña Ramiro
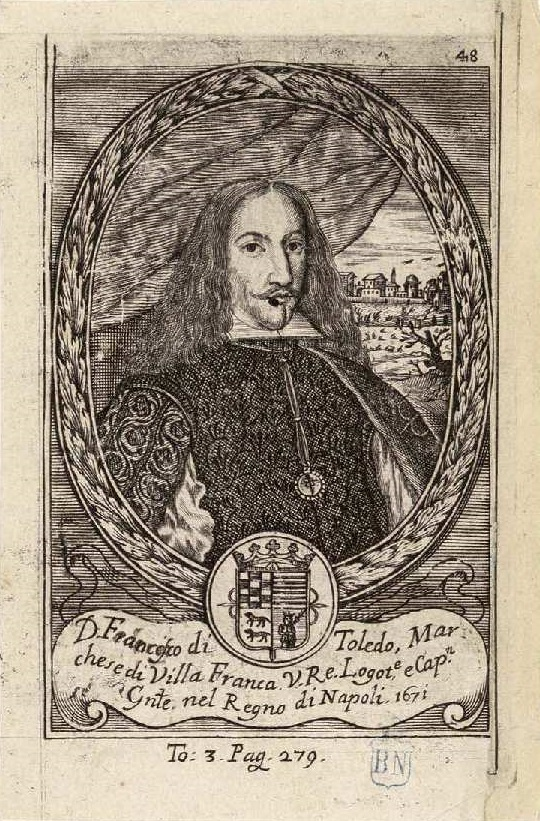
- Fadrique de Toledo Osorio (1694 engraving)
- Born: Fadrique de Toledo Osorio y Ponce de León; 27 February 1635; Madrid, Crown of Castile, Spanish Empire
- Died: 9 June 1705 (aged 70); Madrid, Crown of Castile, Spanish Empire
- Spouse: Manuela de Córdoba y Cardona
- Children: José Fadrique de Toledo Osorio; Antonio Álvarez de Toledo Osorio; Elvira Álvarez de Toledo Osorio; Luis Álvarez de Toledo Osorio; Francisco Álvarez de Toledo Osorio; Teresa Álvarez de Toledo Osorio
- Parent(s): Fadrique de Toledo Osorio; Elvira Ponce de León (mother)
- Military career
- Allegiance: (Spain) Spanish Empire
- Branch: (Spain) Spanish Army
- Service years: 1663–1705
- Rank: General
- Conflicts: Cretan War (1645–1669): Siege of Candia; Franco-Dutch War: Messina revolt

Viceroy of Naples
- Interim; January – September 1671
- Monarch: Charles
- Regent: Mariana of Austria
- Preceded by: Pedro Antonio de Aragón
- Succeeded by: Antonio Pedro Sancho Dávila y Osorio

Viceroy of Sicily
- In office 1673–1676
- Monarch: Philip IV
- Regent: Mariana of Austria
- Preceded by: Pedro Antonio de Aragón
- Succeeded by: Claude Lamoral

President of the Council of Italy
- In office 16 July 1698 – 1701
- Monarchs: Charles II; Philip V
- Chief Minister: Manuel Joaquín Álvarez de Toledo; Luis Manuel Fernández de Portocarrero
- Preceded by: Manuel Joaquín Álvarez de Toledo
- Succeeded by: Antonio Sebastián Álvarez de Toledo

Mayordomo mayor
- In office 1701 – 9 June 1705
- Monarch: Philip V
- Preceded by: Juan Claros Pérez de Guzmán
- Succeeded by: José Manuel Fernández de Velasco y Tovar

Fadrique de Toledo Osorio and Ponce de León (Madrid, 27 February 1635 – Madrid 9 June 1705), II Marquess of Valdueza, VII Marqués de Villafranca del Bierzo, IV Duke of Fernandina, IV Prince of Montalbán, III Count of Peña Ramiro and Grandee of Spain, was a Spanish noble, military and politician.

== Life ==
He was the posthumous son of Fadrique de Toledo, 1st Marquess of Valdueza (died December 1634) and Elvira Ponce de León.

After the death of his uncle García Álvarez de Toledo Osorio in 1648, he inherited his titles and became VII Marqués de Villafranca del Bierzo, IV Duke of Fernandina, IV Prince of Montalbán and III Count of Peña-Ramiro.

He married in 1654 with Manuela de Córdoba y Cardona, daughter of the VII Duke of Sessa, and had 4 sons and 2 daughters.

He pursued a military career and reached his first important position in 1663, as Captain General of the Galleys of Sicily. He participated in 1667 in the (failed) operation to lift the Siege of Candia against the Turks, and was appointed Captain General of the Galleys of Naples in 1670.

He was a successful interim Viceroy of Naples, during the absence of Pedro Antonio de Aragón in 1671. Upon his return to Spain he was proposed to occupy the Viceroyalty of New Spain, but rejected the offer. Two years later he was appointed Viceroy of Sicily (1673–1676), where he faced the Messina revolt. In 1676 he became General Lieutenant of the Sea and shortly after he got the long-awaited position of Captain General of the Ocean. In 1698, he was appointed president of the Council of Italy.

He was always very close to the royal family, accompanying Infanta Margarita to her wedding with Leopold I, Holy Roman Emperor. During the Spanish War of Succession he was a staunch supporter of Philippe de Anjou, who, after becoming King Philip V of Spain, made him Mayordomo mayor (1701), minister of the Junta de Gobierno (1702), Knight of the French Order of the Holy Spirit (1702) and Knight of the Order of Santiago.

== Sources ==
Real Academia de la Historia.
