= San Fermín de los Navarros =

Church in Madrid, Spain

Church of San Fermín de los Navarros
- Iglesia de San Fermín de los Navarros
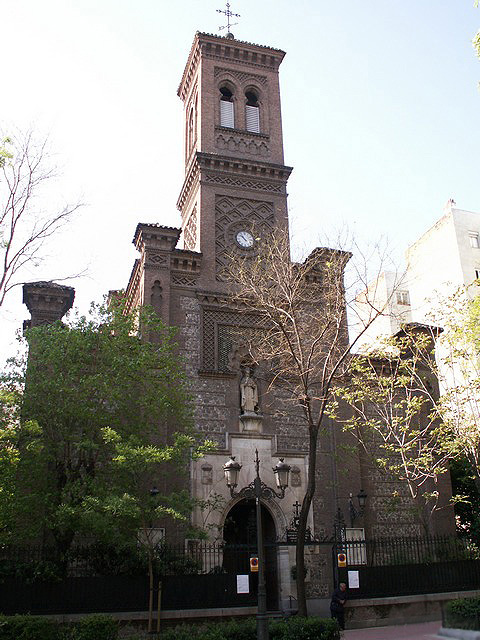
- Interactive map of the Church of San Fermín de los Navarros area

General information
- Type: Church building
- Architectural style: Neo-Mudéjar, Gothic Revival
- Location: Almagro, Madrid, Spain, Paseo de Eduardo Dato, 10
- Coordinates: 40.432725°N 3.692592°W
- Construction started: 1886
- Completed: 1890
- Inaugurated: 6 July 1890

Design and construction
- Architects: Eugenio Jiménez Corera, Carlos Velasco Peinado

Spanish Cultural Heritage
- Type: Non-movable
- Criteria: Monument
- Designated: 20 April 1995
- Reference no.: RI-51-0009079

The Church of San Fermín de los Navarros (Spanish: Iglesia de San Fermín de los Navarros) is a church located in Madrid, Spain. It is dedicated to Saint Fermin (who is associated with Navarre), and replaces an earlier church dedicated to the saint which was demolished to make way for the Bank of Spain.

Projected by Eugenio Jiménez Corera and Carlos Velasco Peinado, the building is constructed from brick. It mixes Neo-Mudéjar and Gothic Revival elements. The Gothic style is employed in the interior, whereas the Mudejar elements are more typical of the exterior. It was designed in 1886 and finished in 1890. It was inaugurated on 6 July 1890.

== Conservation ==
Some of the contents of the church were lost in the Spanish Civil War.

The building was declared Bien de Interés Cultural (asset of cultural interest) on 20 April 1995.

== See also ==
- Catholic Church in Spain
- List of oldest church buildings
