= Javier de Arana =

Spanish tennis player

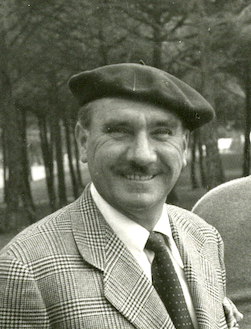
- Pictured visiting the construction works at Real Club de Golf El Prat, 1953
- Full name: Javier de Arana e Ybarra
- Country (sports): Spain
- Born: 5 January 1905
- Died: 14 January 1975 (aged 70)

Javier de Arana e Ybarra (5 January 1905 – 14 January 1975), also known as Javier Arana, was an amateur golfer, sailor and golf course designer born in Bilbao, Spain. He sailed in the 6-metre class at the 1928 Amsterdam Olympics and shortly thereafter he started a career in golf, which included multiple wins in Spanish amateur tournaments.

During World War II, he studied topography and began designing golf courses, and since several of the Spanish courses were devastated during the war, he stepped in to help and eventually designed multiple courses, being usually considered the greatest Spanish golf course architect.

== Sports career ==
Javier was the older child of Luis Arana y Urigüen and Lola Ybarra's three sons. He was introduced to sports at a young age by his father, a leading sportsman. Luis was a successful businessman who was involved with the introduction of sports to Bilbao at the beginning of the 20th century, practicing football, athletics, sailing and golf. Javier started playing golf at the age of 10 years, in the 11-hole course of the Real Sociedad de Golf de Neguri, which had been co-founded by his father in 1911 and was located a mere 500 meters from his summer home in Las Arenas, Getxo.

During his youth, he split his time between golf and sailing, where he became an expert sailor representing Spain at the 1928 Amsterdam Olympic Games in the 6 metre class. However, he found greater success in golf and gradually abandoned sailing at the beginning of the 1930s.

His first relevant golfing victory took place in 1926, when he won the first of his five Vizcaya Championships (1926, 1929, 1931, 1933, and 1935). Since then, and until the outbreak of the Spanish Civil War in 1936, Javier together with his brother Luis Ignacio, became the leading Spanish amateur golfer, as well as one of the best players in Continental Europe. In Spain, Javier was a three-time winner of the Spanish International Amateur Championship (1928, 1933, 1934) and a four-time winner of the Copa Nacional Puerta de Hierro (1928, 1929, 1930, and 1934). In the international arena, he won the Southwest France Championship (1933), the French International Amateur Championship (1934), and the Belgian International Amateur Championship (1935). He was also runner-up in the French International Amateur Championship (1935) and the Swiss International Amateur Championship (1935), and played in the Open Championship in 1934 played at Royal St. Georges, where he was unable to qualify for the final rounds after two rounds of 78 and 77 strokes.

Javier also played a critical role representing Spain in its annual matches against France and in the Spanish national team's maiden European tour of 1935, visiting the France, Belgium, Germany, Italy and Switzerland. The Spanish War brought national golf competitions to a halt until the autumn of 1939, interrupting a promising career in the international amateur scene. Following the war hiatus, Javier gradually abandoned competitive golf, although he still had time to win his last Copa Nacional Puerta de Hierro (1939) and the Portuguese International Amateur Championship (1940). His farewell to competition happened after a 1940 tour of Argentina, where he played the Argentine Amateur Championship, the Argentine Open and the Abierto del Centro before returning to Spain in January 1941.

== Professional career ==
Although the Civil War brought his golfing career to a halt, it also steered Javier into the design of golf courses, for which he is widely known. He was a proficient greenkeeper and the Royal Spanish Golf Federation chose him to lead the reconstruction of golf courses that had been devastated by war. Although he started working in 1940 in Club de Campo, it was the arrival in Madrid in 1946 of English golf course architect Tom Simpson, which ignited Javier's professional career. Simpson had been hired by the neighboring Real Club de la Puerta de Hierro for the reconstruction of its 1914 Harry Colt design, which had also been destroyed by the Ciudad Universitaria battlefront.

Both designers got along well and set-up a partnership under the name Simpson & Arana with the goal of initiating reconstruction work at a national scale. Thus started an intense relationship that would result in the remodelling of Lasarte (1946), Pedreña (1946), Sant Cugat (1946), Terramar (1947) Málaga (1949) and Pedralbes (1949). The main project of this time was the construction of the first 9 holes of the Real Club de Golf Cerdaña, in Puigcerdá, Javier's first solo design.

Simpson's influence over Javier was very relevant. He took him under his patronage and guided his learning under the principles of the strategic school of design. This current had been very successful in Europe in the 1920s and its main advocates, aside from Simpson, were Harry Colt and Alister Mackenzie. Its fundamental principle was that the layout of obstacles in golf courses should be done in a manner that would require intelligence and not only skill to avoid them, adding an additional dimension to the historically dull layouts of the so-called "dark ages" of golf design. Although Arana gradually evolved into a style of his own, the strategic principles always remained a key element of his designs: greens of large size, oriented at a diagonal to the line of play, few bunkers but strategically placed and constant changes in the direction of holes. Other personal treats were his ability to adapt the routing of his golf courses to the available land, always perfectly integrated with the natural surrounds and that the 17th hole should always be a par 3. Following Simpson's departure for England in 1948, Arana pursued the rest of his career on his own, designing golf Reina Cristina (Algeciras) in 1951, El Prat (1955), Club de Campo Black Course (1956), Guadalmina Sur (1959), Real Sociedad de Golf de Neguri (1961), Río Real (1965), Ulzama (1966), RACE (1967), El Saler (1968), Ifach (1974) and Aloha (1975).

Arana's body of work is not very extense: ten 18 hole courses in thirty years of professional activity. Unfortunately, his best years happened at a time where Spain lacked the money and required infrastructure to provide watering supply to most of his projects. Arana is considered the best golf course designer that Continental Europe has ever produced: his designs of El Saler, El Prat and Club de Campo have been regularly ranked as top golf courses in Continental Europe, hosting over 40 professional tour events, the 1965 Canada Cup and over 50 top-level amateur tournaments.

Coupled with his design career, Arana performed an important function in the area of greenkeeping and was the main advocate for proper maintenance as a key element to foster the growth of golf and golfers' enjoyment for years. The opening of El Prat and Club de Campo in the 1950s were a turning point in Spanish golf which evolved from sand greens to courses akin to those found in the British Isles, setting the foundations for various generations of golf players that have positioned Spanish golf at the privileged position it enjoys today.

== Legacy ==
In 2013, the economist Alfonso Erhardt Ybarra (Málaga, 1972) took almost five years to produce The Golf Courses of Javier Arana, a book about the stature of the character of Arana and the almost non-existent information that there was about him.

== Bibliography ==
- Erhardt Ybarra, A. (2013). The Golf Courses of Javier Arana. Turner Libros.
