= Finca =

Estate, rural land or Spanish holiday home

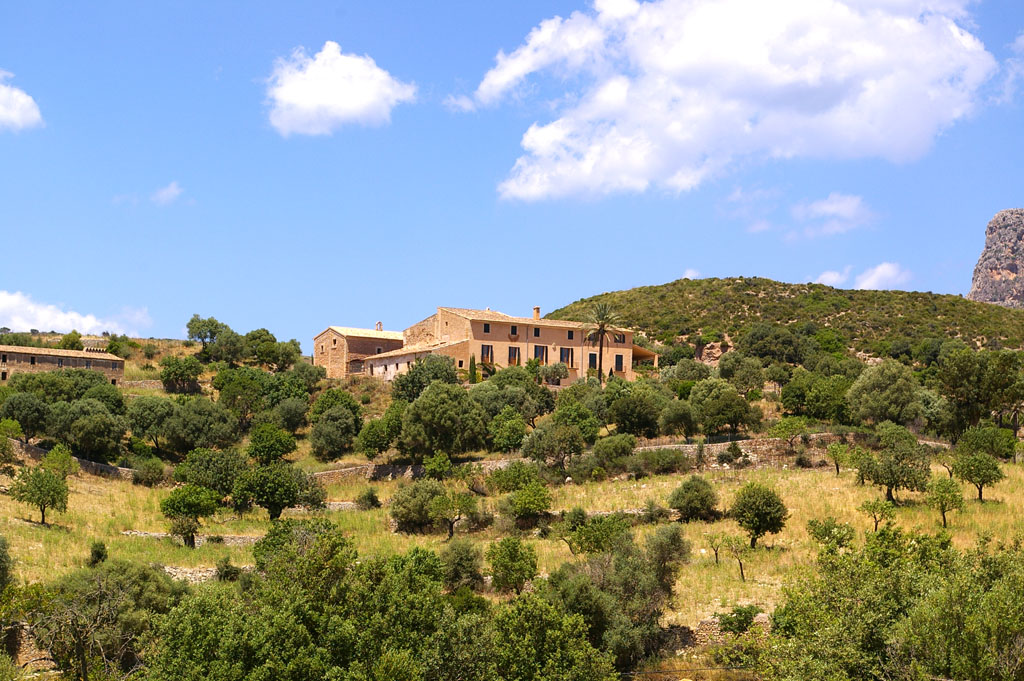
A finca in Mallorca

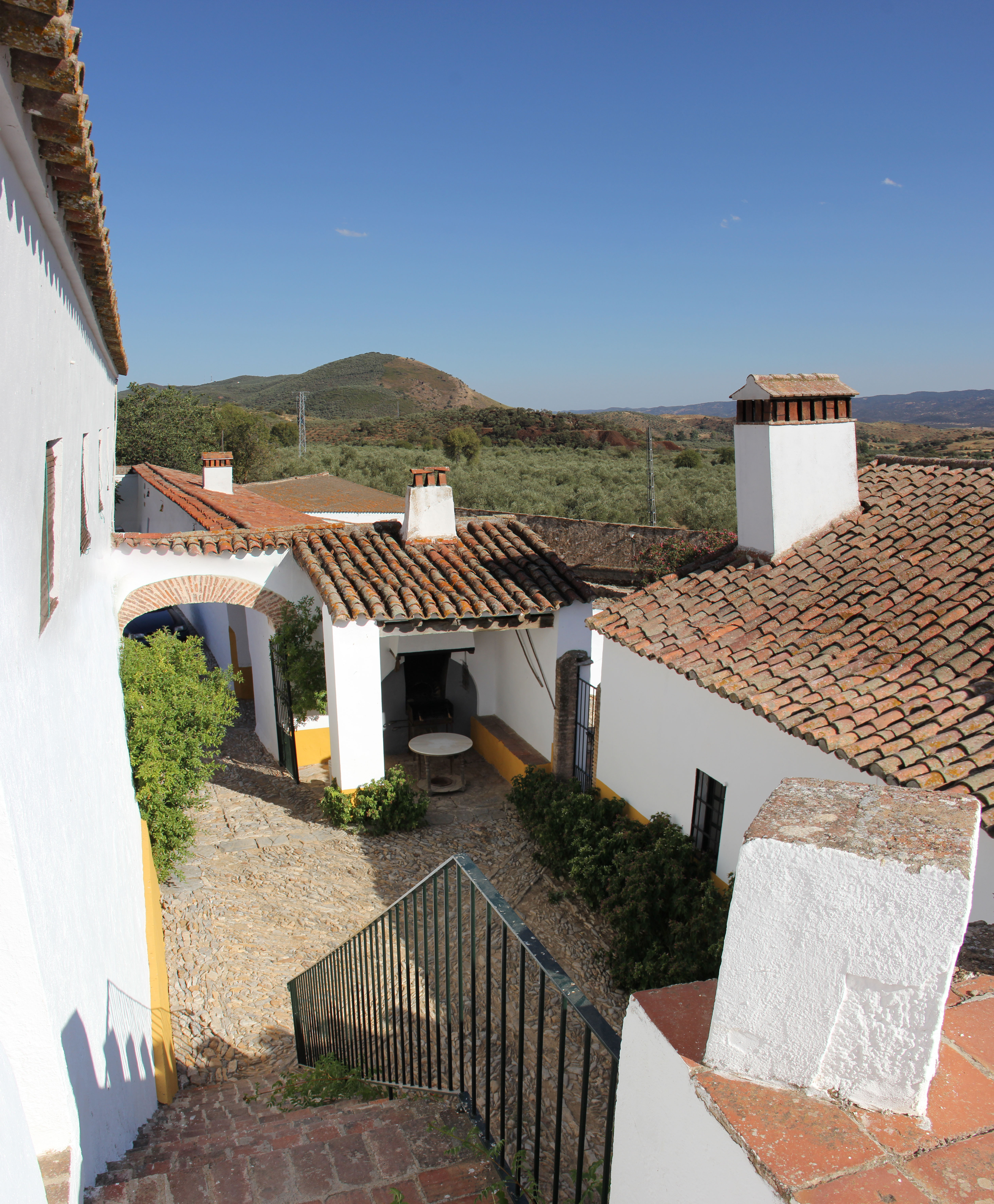
A cortijo in a finca in Seville

Finca ([ˈfiŋka]) is a Spanish term for estate. In English usage, it refers to a piece of rural or agricultural land, typically with a cottage, farmhouse or estate building present, and often adjacent to a woodland or plantation.

== Overview ==
Especially in tourism, the term has recently gained the colloquial meaning of a holiday home in a rural setting, situated on the Spanish mainland, the Balearics, and the Canary Islands, and throughout the countries of Spanish-speaking Latin America.

Fincas can typically look back on an extensive development history, and are often older than 300 years. In some regions, however, especially on the Balearics, new buildings are erected.
