= Marquess of Bolarque =

Noble title in Spain

Marquessate of Bolarque
- Creation date: 24 May 1913
- Created by: Alfonso XIII
- Peerage: Peerage of Spain
- First holder: Estanislao de Urquijo y Ussía, 1st Marquess of Bolarque
- Present holder: Estanislao de Urquijo y Rubio, 4th Marquess of Bolarque

Marquess of Bolarque (Spanish: Marqués de Bolarque) is a noble title in the peerage of Spain, bestoweded on Estanislao de Urquijo, 3rd Marquess of Urquijo, by King Alfonso XIII on 24 May 1913.

The title refers to the area of Salto de Bolarque, in the province of Guadalajara, where Estanislao Urquijo contributed greatly with his industrial work.

== Marquesses of Bolarque (1913) ==
- Estanislao de Urquijo y Ussía, 1st Marquess of Bolarque (1872–1948)
- Luis de Urquijo y Landecho, 2nd Marquess of Bolarque (1899–1975), eldest son of the 1st Marquess
- Juan Ignacio de Urquijo y Eulate, 3rd Marquess of Bolarque (1934–2010), eldest son of the 2nd Marquess
- Estanislao de Urquijo y Rubio, 4th Marquess of Bolarque (b. 1963), eldest son of 3rd Marquess

== See also ==
- Marquess of Urquijo

== Bibliography ==
- Hidalgos de España, Real Asociación de (2018). Elenco de Grandezas y Títulos Nobiliarios Españoles. Ediciones Hidalguía. ISBN 978-84-94841-02-6.
