= Luis de Urquijo, 2nd Marquess of Bolarque =

Spanish diplomat, banker and businessman (1899-1975)

Luis de Urquijo y Landecho
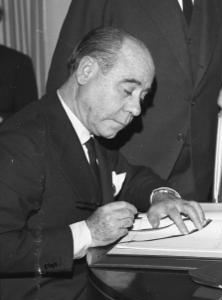
- Urquijo in 1960

Spanish ambassador to West Germany
- In office 12 May 1959 – 19 November 1964

6th president of Real Madrid
- In office 16 May 1926 – 1930
- Preceded by: Pedro Parages
- Succeeded by: Luis Usera Bugallal

Personal details
- Born: 28 January 1899 Madrid, Kingdom of Spain
- Died: 7 July 1975 (aged 76) Madrid, Spanish State
- Occupation: Diplomat, banker, businessman

Luis de Urquijo y Landecho, 2nd Marquess of Bolarque (28 January 1899 – 7 July 1975) was a Spanish diplomat, banker and businessman who served as a Spanish ambassador to West Germany from 12 May 1959 until 19 November 1964. He was also the 6th president of Real Madrid from 16 May 1926 to 1930. De Urquijo was born in Madrid.

== Honours ==
- Grand Cross of the Order of Civil Merit (1958)
- Grand Cross of the Order of Isabella the Catholic (1960)
- Grand Cross of the Order of Charles III (1964)

Spanish nobility
Preceded by Estanislao de Urquijo	Marquess of Bolarque; 1948–1975	Succeeded by Juan Ignacio de Urquijo
