= Marquess of Urquijo =

Marquessate of Urquijo
- Creation date: 13 May 1871
- Created by: Amadeo I
- Peerage: Peerage of Spain
- First holder: Estanislao de Urquijo y Landaluce, 1st Marquess of Urquijo
- Present holder: Victoria Urquijo y Caruncho, 7th Marchioness of Urquijo

Marquess of Urquijo (Spanish: Marqués de Urquijo) is a noble title in the peerage of Spain accompanied by the dignity of Grandee of Spain, bestowed on Estanislao de Urquijo y Landaluce by King Amadeo I on 13 May 1871.

On 1 August 1980, the 5th Marchioness of Urquijo, María Lourdes de Urquijo and her husband, Manuel de la Sierra, were famously murdered in their Madrid home by their son in law, Rafael Escobedo. The crime, which became one of the most followed on Spanish media, is considered one of the most prominent criminal acts of post-Francoist Spain.

== Marquesses of Urquijo (1871) ==
- Estanislao de Urquijo y Landaluce, 1st Marquess of Urquijo (1817-1889)
- Juan Manuel de Urquijo y Urrutia, 2nd Marquess of Urquijo (1843-1914), eldest son of the Fulgencio Urquijo y Landaluce, brother of the 1st Marquess
- Estanislao de Urquijo y Ussía, 3rd Marquess of Urquijo (1872-1948), eldest son of the 2nd Marquess
- Juan Manuel de Urquijo y Landecho, 4th Marquess of Urquijo (1899-1968), eldest son of the 3rd Marquess
- María de Lourdes de Urquijo y Morenés, 5th Marchioness of Urquijo (1935-1980), eldest daughter of the 4th Marquess
- Juan Manuel de la Sierra y Urquijo, 6th Marquess of Urquijo (1958-2022), eldest son of the 5th Marchioness
- Victoria Urquijo y Caruncho, 7th Marchioness of Urquijo (b. 2002), eldest daughter of the 6th Marquess

== See also ==
- List of current grandees of Spain
- Assassination of the Marquesses of Urquijo
- Marquess of Bolarque
