= Izard =

Izard may refer to:

== People ==
=== Surname ===
- Alexis Izard (born 1992), French politician
- Carroll Izard (1923–2017), American psychologist known for his contributions to Differential Emotions Theory (DET)
- Charles Beard Izard (1829–1904), New Zealand lawyer and politician; father of
- Charles Hayward Izard (1860–1925), New Zealand lawyer and politician
- Christophe Izard, French TV producer
- Ernest Izard, New Zealand cricketer
- Gabriel Izard, French bobsledder
- George Izard (1776–1828), general in the United States Army during the War of 1812 and governor of the Arkansas Territory
- Georges Izard, French politician
- Harold H. Izard, American politician
- Herbert Izard, Archdeacon of Singapore
- Mark W. Izard (1799–1866), 2nd Governor of Nebraska Territory
- Norma Izard, English cricketer
- Ralph Izard (1742-1804), American politician and president pro tempore of US Senate
- Stephanie Izard (born 1976), American chef
- Teresa Gali-Izard, Spanish architect

=== Politicians (multiple) ===
- Governor Izard, multiple people
- Senator Izard, multiple people

=== Middle name ===
• John Izard Middleton

== Places ==
- Izard County, Arkansas

== Other ==
- Pyrenean Chamois or izard, a species of goat-antelope

== See also ==
- Izzard
- Isard (disambiguation)
- Izard family of Beckley (see heading 'Parish church')
