= Izzard =

Izzard may refer to:

- Izzard, an 18th-century dialectal name for the letter Z
- Izzard (fanzine), a science fiction fanzine

== Surname ==
- Bob Izzard, 1930s Australian rugby league player
- Brad Izzard, 1980s Australian rugby league player
- Coziah Izzard, (born 2001), American football player
- Craig Izzard, 1980s–1990s Australian rugby league player
- Eddie Izzard, English comedian and actor
- Grant Izzard, 1990s Australian rugby league player
- Mark Izzard, Canadian former ice hockey player
- Molly Izzard (1919–2004), English writer and wife of Ralph Izzard
- Ralph Izzard (1910–1992), English journalist, author, adventurer and naval intelligence officer

== See also ==
- Isard (disambiguation)
- Izard (disambiguation)
