= Buru (disambiguation) =

Buru is an island in Indonesia.

Buru may also refer to:

- Buru Island or Turnagain Island (Queensland), Australia
- Buru, Cluj, Romania
- Buru of Gojoseon
- Buru people
- Buru language
- Buru Regency, a regency of Maluku province, Indonesia
- Hae Buru of Dongbuyeo, king of Bukbuyeo and founder of Dongbuyeo
- Buru or Ugali, a cornmeal mush
- Buru (beach soccer) (born 1976), Brazilian beach soccer player
- Buru (legendary creature), an aquatic animal featured in a foundation myth of the Apatani people
- HD 83443 b, an exoplanet named Buru
