= Isard =

Isard may refer to:

- Pistol Isard, a Spanish semi-automatic pistol
- Pyrenean chamois or isard
- Andorra national rugby union team or Els Isards
- Isard, an interactive geometry program

== People with the surname ==
- Walter Isard (1919–2010), American economist

=== Fictional ===
- Ysanne Isard, a character in the Star Wars franchise

== See also ==
- Isarn (disambiguation)
- Izard (disambiguation)
- Izzard (disambiguation)
