= Charles Izard =

Charles Izard may refer to:

- Charles Beard Izard (1829–1904), member of parliament and lawyer in Wellington, New Zealand
- Charlie Izard (Charles Hayward Izard, 1860–1925), his son, member of parliament and lawyer in Wellington, New Zealand

== See also ==
- Izard (disambiguation)
