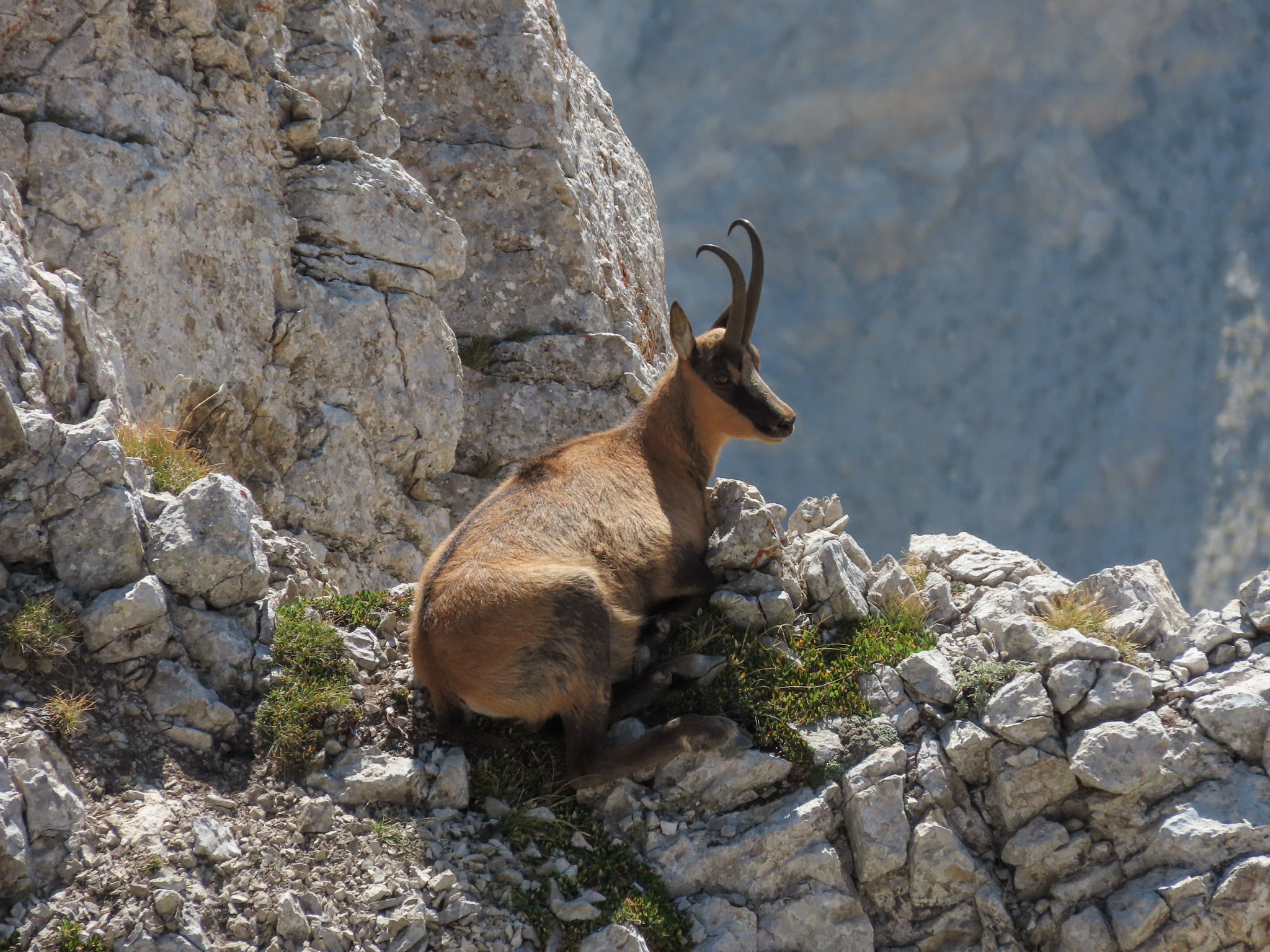

Conservation status
- Vulnerable (IUCN 3.1)

Scientific classification
- Kingdom: Animalia
- Phylum: Chordata
- Class: Mammalia
- Order: Artiodactyla
- Family: Bovidae
- Subfamily: Caprinae
- Genus: Rupicapra
- Species: R. pyrenaica
- Subspecies: R. p. ornata

Trinomial name
- Rupicapra pyrenaica ornata Neumann, 1899

= Abruzzo chamois =

Subspecies of mammal

Abruzzo chamois (Rupicapra pyrenaica ornata) is a goat-antelope native to the central Apennine Mountains in central and southern Italy. It is one of three subspecies of Pyrenean chamois, the other two being R. p. pyrenaica and R. p. parva.

== Classification ==
While traditionally categorized as a subspecies of Pyrenean chamois, some sources consider the Abruzzo chamois to be its own monotypic species under the scientific name Rupicapra ornata. An analysis of mitochondrial DNA found in Alpine and Pyrennean chamois specimens found both species to be non-monophyletic, with the Abruzzo chamois belonging to a population genetically distinct from either species.

== Description ==
Possessing a slim build, the Abruzzo chamois measures 100 to 130 centimetres (39 to 51 in) long and 70 to 80 centimetres (28 to 31 in) tall at the shoulders. Males typically weigh around 30 kilograms (66 lb), while females weigh about 27 kilograms (60 lb). Both males and females have long, slender horns that hook at the end. The Abruzzo chamois can be distinguished from Iberian subspecies by its coat, sporting comparatively large patches of light fur on its throat, shoulders, and rump. Their specialized hooves have concave soles, sharp, hard edges, and point slightly downward in the front. These adaptations allow them to climb rocks using small projections, prevent themselves from skidding on steep surfaces, move effectively on ice, and quickly brake while running downhill.

== Behavior ==
Abruzzo chamois primarily group together in herds of females and male young, while adult males remain solitary or in small groups for most of the year. Within groups of females, dominance and social rank are determined based on age, horn length, and most prominently bodyweight.

== Habitat ==
Preferring steep, mountainous environments, Abruzzo chamois generally live at elevations of 1,200 to 2,000 metres (3,900 to 6,600 ft) above sea level.

== Distribution ==
During the late Pleistocene and early Holocene the subspecies occupied a range that stretched from Marche in the north to Calabria in the south. However, in the present it is confined to a handful of national parks in and around Abruzzo, including the Abruzzo, Lazio and Molise National Park, Maiella National Park, Gran Sasso and Monti della Laga National Park, and Monti Sibillini National Park.

== Conservation ==
While both extant Iberian subspecies of Pyrenean chamois are listed as least concern, the Abruzzo chamois is listed as vulnerable on account of its lower population and restricted range. It is estimated that there are over 3,000 individuals split between 5 populations. The subspecies was previously assessed as endangered in 1996, but successful reintroduction programs have resulted in a substantial population increase. Persistent obstacles to their conservation include fragmented habitats, low genetic diversity, competition with domestic caprids, and the effects of climate change upon grasslands inhabited by Abruzzo chamois.

Between 1991 and 2006, 22 female and 18 male Abruzzo chamois were released in Maiella National Park, which have developed into a self-sustaining population of over 1,400 individuals as of 2021.

In 2026, Coenurosis, caused by the parasite Taenia multiceps, was first documented in an Abruzzo chamois from Monti Sibillini National Park. The risk posed by parasitic infections to Abruzzo chamois conservation is exacerbated by low genetic diversity, restricted range, and environmental overlap with domestic hosts such as herding dogs and sheep.
