= Isarn =

Isarn may refer to:

- Isarn, Count of Pallars (died 948)
- Isarn (bishop of Grenoble) (died 976)
- Isarn (troubadours), the name of three mid-13th century troubadours
- Isarn (inquisitor) (fl. before 1292), French Dominican missionary, inquisitor and writer
- William Isarn (died 1010s), Count of Ribagorza

== See also ==
- Isard (disambiguation)
