= Ralph Izzard =

English author and journalist (1910–1992)

Ralph Izzard OBE
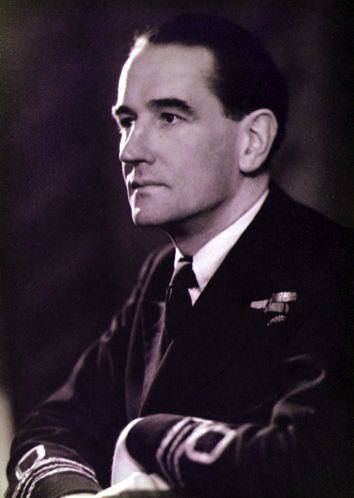
- Ralph Izzard, circa 1944.
- Born: Ralph William Burdick Izzard; 27 August 1910; Billericay, Essex, England
- Died: 2 December 1992 (aged 82); Pembury, Kent, England
- Education: Caldicott School; The Leys School; Queens' College, Cambridge
- Occupations: Journalist; Novelist; Adventurer
- Spouse(s): Ellen Schmidt-Klewitz (1931–1946); Molly Crutchleigh-FitzPatrick (1947–1992)
- Children: Christina; Benedict; Miles; Anthea; Sabrina; Sebastian
- Parent(s): Percy and Florence Burdick Izzard

Ralph William Burdick Izzard, OBE (27 August 1910 – 2 December 1992) was an English journalist, author, adventurer and, during World War II, a British Naval Intelligence officer.

As a journalist, Izzard spent virtually his entire career with one newspaper, the Daily Mail. After rising to the position of Berlin bureau chief, he remained a star of the paper for 31 years. The stories he covered took him from Egypt to Algeria, Lebanon to Kenya, Korea and beyond.

In addition to his duties with the Daily Mail, he wrote four books chronicling his experiences in India, Nepal and the Middle East. He is best known for the most famous of his exploits, when, as portrayed in his book The Innocent on Everest, he set out on his own, without a compass or map, to pursue John Hunt's 1953 Everest expedition to its base camp at 18,000 ft.

During World War II, Izzard served with distinction as an officer with British Naval Intelligence and 30 Assault Unit. He received several awards and was appointed an OBE. His tour of duty took place under the command of Ian Fleming, who based elements of his first novel Casino Royale and its protagonist James Bond on Lieutenant Commander Izzard and a card game in which he found himself playing poker against covert Nazi intelligence agents at a casino in Pernambuco, Brazil.

== Early life ==
Born in Billericay, Essex on 27 August 1910 to Percy and Florence Burdick Izzard, Ralph Izzard was the youngest of the couple's two children. His sister, Floris, was born in 1907. His father, Percy Izzard, was the Daily Mail's highly respected gardening correspondent (claimed by Ralph to have been the inspiration of William Boot in the Evelyn Waugh novel Scoop).

In 1919, Izzard entered Caldicott School, a preparatory school for boys near London, where he remained enrolled until 1924. Then, aged 13, he entered The Leys School, where, in addition to his studies, he played water-polo. In 1928, his term at The Leys School being complete, he went on to Queens' College, Cambridge and graduated in 1931. That same year he joined the staff at the Daily Mail.

== Foreign correspondent in Berlin ==
After graduation from Cambridge, Izzard was appointed as foreign correspondent for the Daily Mail. His first post was Berlin where he was appointed and remained bureau chief for a number of years during the cold war. Afterwards Izzard stayed on as a foreign correspondent for 31 years. It has been speculated that in addition to performing his actual duties with the Daily Mail, Izzard used the position as a cover while engaged in intelligence operations for MI6.

== World War II ==
=== Royal Navy Volunteer Reserves ===
At the onset of World War II, Izzard joined the Royal Navy Volunteer Reserves as an Ordinary Seaman, and qualified as a gunner but was soon commissioned a Sub-Lieutenant, eventually ascending to the rank of Lieutenant Commander in a position with British Naval Intelligence. He served with distinction, being Mentioned in Despatches and appointed OBE.

=== British Intelligence, 30 AU, MI9, MI19 ===
Ralph Izzard was recruited to the Naval Intelligence Division and 30 Assault Unit by Ian Fleming due, in some measure, to his ability to speak fluent German, as well as his expert knowledge of Berlin and its society. His duties included the interrogation of captured German combatants, intelligence collection in the battlespace, and espionage. The British Admiralty operated an interrogation centre known as the "CSDIC" (Combined Services Detailed Interrogation Centre) at Cockfosters Camp for the joint use of the Royal Navy, the R.A.F., and the British Army. Izzard regularly participated in the questioning of PoWs and provided detailed reports to his superiors regarding intelligence obtained as a result of interrogation. A number of his reports and letters were forwarded to and read by Winston Churchill.

Prior to its entry into World War II, the United States Navy sent an intelligence officer to Great Britain to observe the interrogation of German PoWs, for which the Royal Navy provided a liaison officer: (then) LT Ralph Izzard, (RNVR). Izzard trained the initial cadre of U.S. Navy PoW interrogators and was further tasked with travelling to the United States in order to instruct operatives in the disciplines of cryptanalysis, interrogation, and intelligence dissemination. He was instrumental in establishing Op-16-Z, a section of the U.S. Office of Naval Intelligence, which dealt with the processing of enemy prisoners. Subsequently, British protocol for prisoner debriefing was adopted by the U.S. Armed Forces, and the Joint Interrogation Center for Prisoners of War was established in 1941.

Izzard also participated in the creation of a plan (codenamed Operation Ruthless), the objective of which was to obtain German Naval Enigma documentation to aid British Intelligence in the decryption of secret German communications. The plan consisted of crashing a captured German aeroplane into the English Channel where the British crew, dressed in Luftwaffe uniforms, would be rescued by a German patrol boat. The "survivors" would then kill the German crew, hijack the ship, and confiscate the secret Enigma documents. Much to the annoyance of codebreakers at Bletchley Park, the operation was scrapped. In a BBC Radio 4 program called The Bond Correspondence broadcast on 24 May 2008, Lucy Fleming, the niece of Ian Fleming, stated that the plan was cancelled because the Royal Air Force concluded that a downed Heinkel bomber dropped into the English Channel would sink rather than float, posing too great a danger to the lives of British operatives.

=== Awards ===
- OBE
- 1939-1945 Star
- Atlantic Star
- Pacific Star
- France and Germany Star
- Defence Medal
- War Medal 1939–1945 (Oak leaf)
- Mentioned in Dispatches

== Cryptozoology ==
Izzard took an interest in cryptozoology, a pseudoscience. In 1945, Izzard accompanied by naturalist C. R. Stonor took a pseudo-scientific expedition to the Silo (Ziro) Valley of Arunachal Pradesh to search for evidence for the Buru, a legendary lizard creature. Izzard published a book, The Hunt for the Buru which presented the results of the expedition. Izzard concluded that extant saurians, seemingly dinosaurs (four metres in length) had existed in the valley until as recently as 1940. This view was rejected by scientists as dinosaurs became extinct approximately 66 million years ago.

== Personal life ==
Izzard was married to Ellen Schmidt-Klewitz from 1931 to 1946 with whom he had a daughter, Christina. Izzard had a son with the German actress Marianne Hoppe, Benedikt Hoppe being born in 1946. He was married to Molly Crutchleigh-FitzPatrick from 1947 to 1992 with whom he had two daughters and two sons, Miles, Anthea, Sabrina and Sebastian.

== Bibliography ==
- The Hunt for the Buru, (1951) ISBN 978-0-941936-65-1
- The Innocent on Everest, (1954), ISBN 978-1-4067-1491-3
- The Abominable Snowman Adventure, (1955)
- Smelling the Breezes, (Co-Author with Molly) (1959)
