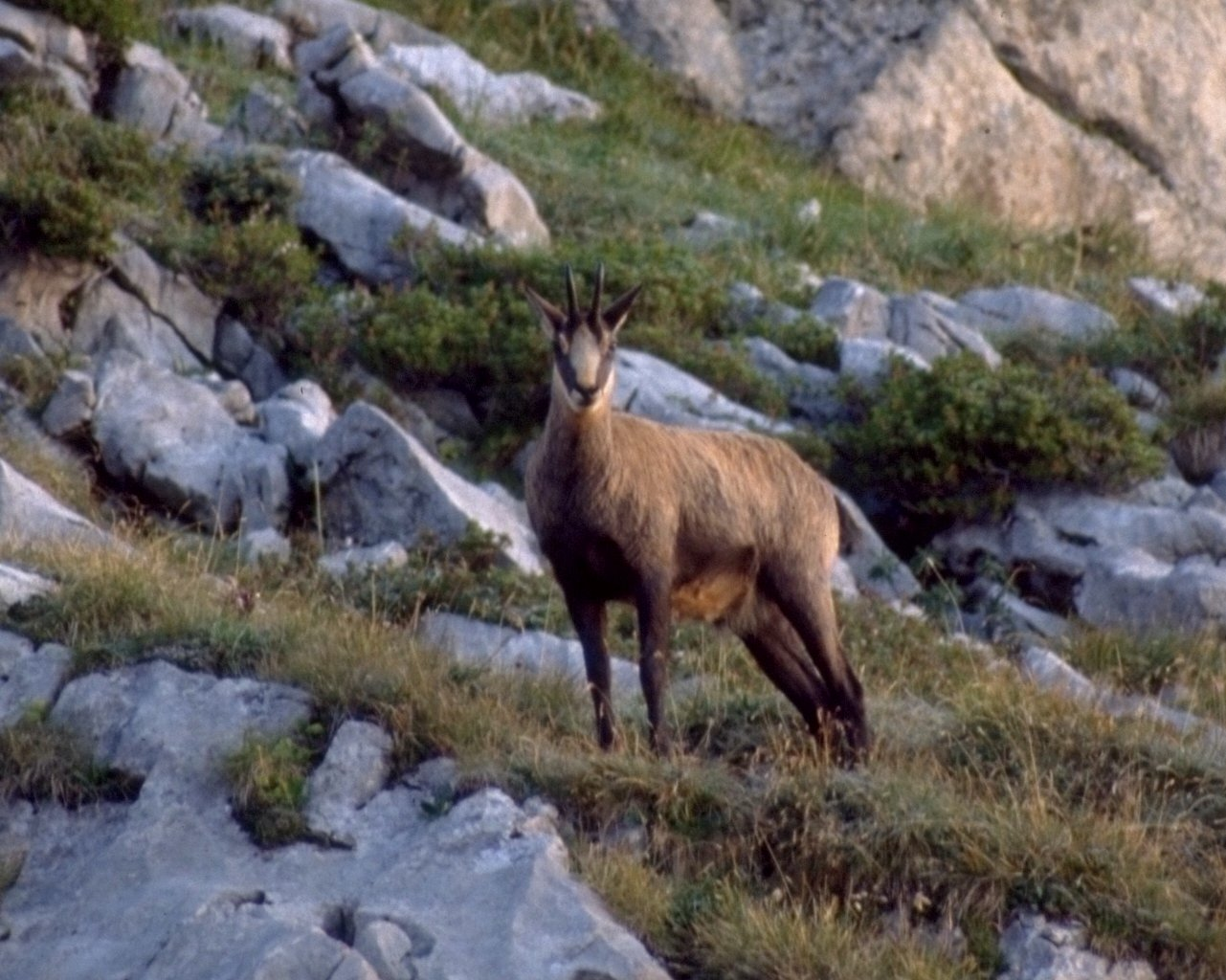
- Chamois

Scientific classification
- Kingdom: Animalia
- Phylum: Chordata
- Class: Mammalia
- Order: Artiodactyla
- Family: Bovidae
- Subfamily: Caprinae
- Tribe: Caprini
- Genus: Rupicapra; Garsault, 1764

Type species
- Capra rupicapra Linnaeus, 1768
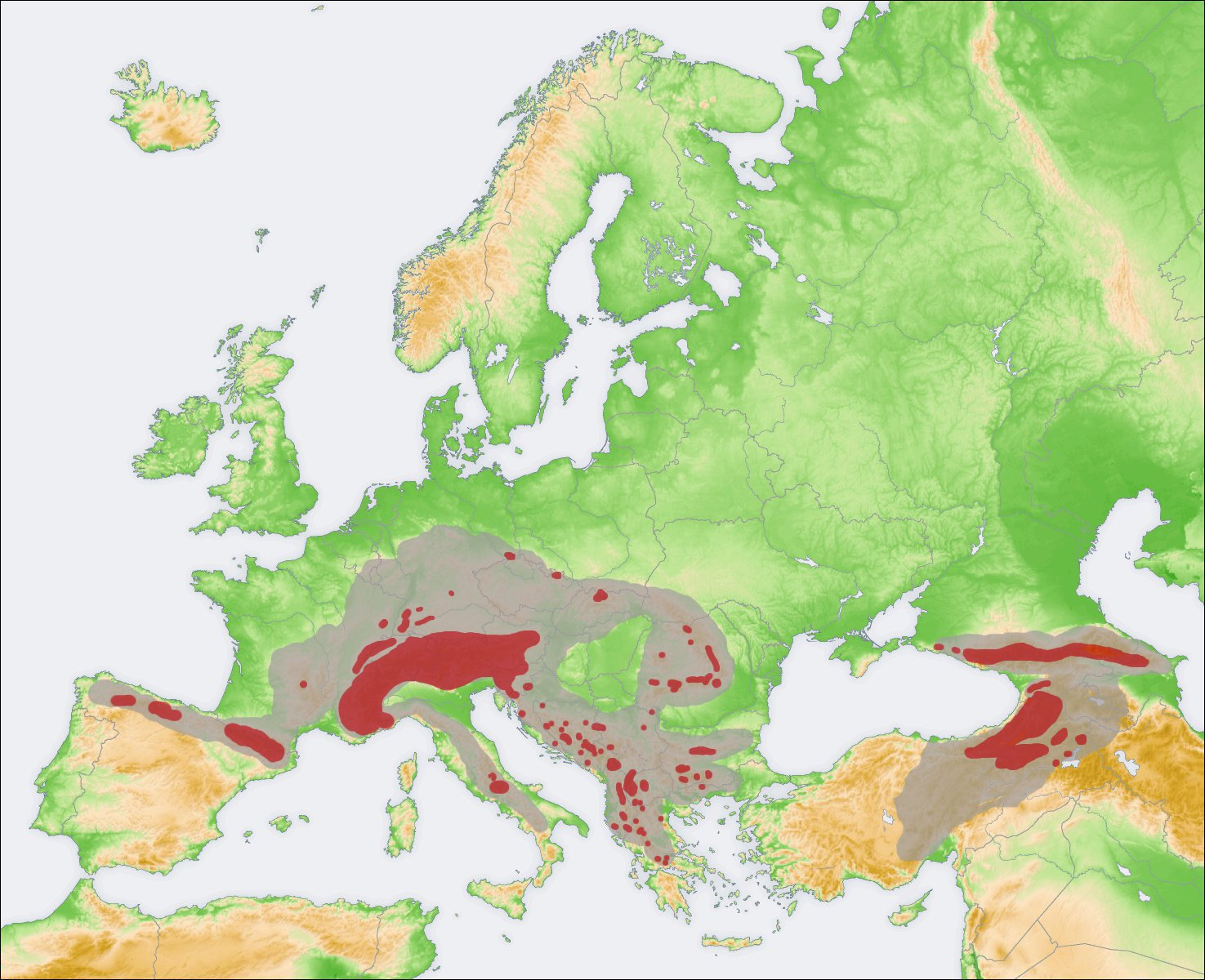
- Range of Rupicapra during the Holocene (grey) and present range (red)

= Rupicapra =

Genus of mammals

Rupicapra is a genus of two species of goat-antelope called chamois. They belong to the bovine family of hoofed mammals, the Bovidae.

== Taxonomy ==
Two extant species are accepted.

Image	Scientific name	Common name	Distribution	Subspecies
	Rupicapra rupicapra	Alpine chamois	The mountains of southern and central Europe, and Turkey and the Caucasus in southwest Asia	Seven subspecies; see the species page for details
	Rupicapra pyrenaica	Pyrenean chamois	The Pyrenees and Cantabrian Mountains in southwestern Europe, and the Apennines in Italy	Three subspecies, R. p. pyrenaica in the Pyrenees, R. p. parva (Cantabrian chamois) in the Cantabrian Mountains, and R. p. ornata (Apennine chamois) in the Apennines.

== Description ==
Both male and female have hook-shaped horns that slightly curl backwards and grow little by little each year, never falling off. Their coats are light brown and short-haired in the summer, and darker and longer-haired in the winter; the head has two pale creamy-white patches, from the nose to between the horns, and from the chin round the cheeks and behind the eyes to just below the ears; the pale patches are separated by dark stripes from the mouth up through the eye to the back of the head. There are also two darker bands on their flanks.

== Behaviour ==
In the summer, the Apennine chamois prefers rock faces and pasture lands at heights above 1,700 m (5,600 ft) for its habitat, and in the winter it prefers to retreat to the woods below. The diet consists of grasses, leaves, buds, shoots and fungi. Adult males prefer a solitary life, only approaching females during the mating season. Groups consist only of females, young males, and "kids". Females give birth to only one kid after a gestation period of 23 to 24 weeks.

== Conservation ==
A 2014 study by Durham University discovered that these goats are shrinking in size due to global warming and climatic changes.
