= Molly Izzard =

English writer (1919–2004)

- Born: Molly Crutchleigh-Fitzpatrick; 1 August 1919; Cornwall, England, United Kingdom
- Died: 4 February 2004 (aged 84); Royal Tunbridge Wells, England, United Kingdom
- Citizenship: United Kingdom
- Occupation: Writer
- Years active: 1959–1993
- Spouse: Ralph Izzard (m. 1948; died 1992)
- Children: 4

Molly Izzard (née Crutchleigh-Fitzpatrick; 1 August 1919 – 4 February 2004) was an English writer. She was the co-author of the book Smelling The Breezes, published in 1959, about a camping trek she and her family took in the High Lebanon mountains. Izzard subsequently wrote A Private Life in 1963 on her private life at work. In 1969, she authored A Life of Dame Helen Gwynne Vaughan and The Gulf: Arabian Western Approaches on Middle Eastern events ten years later. Izzard's final work was a controversial biography of the explorer Freya Stark, published in 1993.

== Early life ==
On 1 August 1919, Izzard was born Molly Crutchleigh-Fitzpatrick, in Cornwall, England. Her father was of Anglo-Indian stock, and exited Calcutta to work on a British Guiana sugar plantation. Following the separation of her parents, Izzard accompanied her father to India.

She attended convents in Cherbourg and Darjeeling. After the death of her father in a car accident, she moved back to Britain and was educated at Dollar Academy in Clackmannanshire before matriculating at a finishing school in Genoa. Izzard did not feel comfortable in such an environment and moved to Hungary to live with an aristocratic count and his family.

Just before the Second World War, she again returned to Britain to join the First Aid Nursing Yeomanry as a driver before taking on intelligence duties ferrying influential individuals across London for the following three years. Izzard also served under Sefton Delmer in the propaganda agency, the Political Warfare Executive.

== Career ==
She co-authored her first book, Smelling The Breezes, with her husband Ralph Izzard in 1959, and was republished as A Walk in the Mountains in the United States the following year. The book Izzard wrote was about the two-month 300 mi (480 km) camping trek she and her family took through the High Lebanon mountains by donkey in 1957.

Izzard's second book, A Private Life, followed in 1963. In the book, she details her memories of the first seven years of her marriage to Ralph Izzard. She also reported on the Partition of India, bringing up her family amongst the Egyptian revolution of 1952, and life in British Cyprus (1878–1960) in 1960, as it transitioned to an independent state.

In 1969, Izzard authored A Life of Dame Helen Gwynne Vaughan on a commission from her publishers. Ten years later, Izzard wrote, The Gulf: Arabian Western Approaches, which was a first-hand account of the rise of the nation-states Bahrain, Kuwait and the Emirates set against Saudi Arabia's restrictive Wahhabism. The book also covered Iraqi and Iranian power when Anglo oil companies lost their grip on the region.

She was asked by her publishers John Murray to write a biography on the explorer Freya Stark. Izzard met Stark in the small Italian town of Asolo and noticed that accounts of her life were fabricated."Izzard extensively investigated Stark after this incident.". She revealed further information on the explorer. When the Murray family reviewed the manuscript, they asked Izzard to make alterations to it, since it depicted Stark, also a John Murray author, in a negative light. Izzard refused to make any changes whatsoever. The book was published by Hodder & Stoughton in 1993 and was received negatively by enthusiasts of Stark. It got mixed comments from reviewers.

== Personal life ==
She married Ralph Izzard, a Daily Mail Middle East correspondent, circa 1948 in Delhi until he died in 1992. They had four children. On 4 February 2004, Izzard died in Royal Tunbridge Wells in England.

== Legacy ==
The correspondent for The Times wrote of Izzard, "[she] had an enquiring mind, and her five books, on very different topics, were notable for their candour and the perceptiveness of her observations." The Guardian writer Veronica Horwell said the writer was one of the sharpest of a foreign correspondent's wife who was experienced in public affairs and knew of constructing "daily connections with the realities of a place."
