= Isarn (inquisitor) =

Medieval French churchman

Isarn or Izarn was a 13th-century French Dominican missionary, inquisitor, and writer. Among his works is a fictitious dialogue between himself and an adherent of Catharism.

== "News of the Heretic" ==
Sometime before 1292 Isarn wrote a 700-verse poetic dialogue in Occitan between himself and a fictitious Cathar bishop named Sicart de Figueiras. Novas del eretge ("News of the Heretic"), or The Controversy of Izarn, with an Albigense Theologian, as it is known, is a long diatribe against Catharism and its alleged doctrines. Isarn is sometimes inaccurate, but his ignorance, and that of many Catholics, as to the particulars of Cathar dogma, is probably the result of the meetings in thickets and bushes which he describes. The Cathars, in order to preach in the vernacular from vernacular Scriptures, often held secret meetings in the woods to escape notice.

Isarn seems to believe that Cathars and Waldensians both believe some form of Manichaeism. He defends marriage against virginity as the supreme chastity. He is convinced moreover that the Ja no fara crezens heretje ni baudes / Si agues bon pastor que lur contradisses ("Yet they would not believe heretics (Cathars) or Waldensians / If they had a good pastor to contradict them [the heretics]"). At the end of the dialogue, the Cathar bishop is converted. Isarn initially portrays the converted heretic as desirous to keep his conversion a secret so that he may easily teach his followers the true faith. Isarn does not let this play out; he soon portrays the bishop as a copy of his own rabid Catholicism.
