= Governor Izard =

Governor Izard may refer to:

- George Izard (1776–1828), 2nd Governor of Arkansas Territory
- Mark W. Izard (1799–1866), 2nd Governor of Nebraska Territory
