= Senator Izard =

Senator Izard may refer to:

- Mark W. Izard (1799–1866), Arkansas State Senate
- Ralph Izard (1740s–1804), U.S. Senator from South Carolina
