= Teresa Gali-Izard =

Spanish landscape architect, agronomist and educator

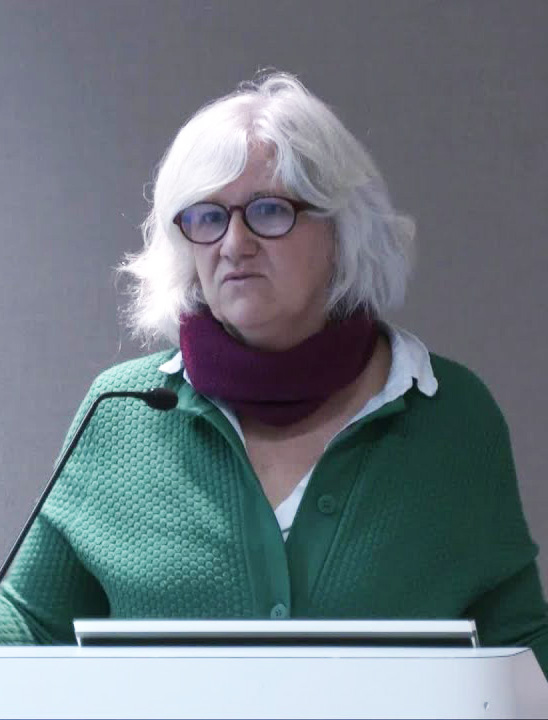
- lecture at Harvard GSD
- Born: 1968 (age 57–58); Barcelona, Spain
- Education: Polytechnic University of Catalonia
- Occupation: Landscape architect
- Known for: Landscape architect, professor

Teresa Gali-Izard (born 1968, Barcelona) is a Spanish landscape architect, agronomist and professor of landscape architecture.

== Early life and education ==
Gali-Izard was born in Barcelona in 1968. She received degrees in Agricultural Engineering and a Postgraduate in Landscape Architecture from Escuela Superior de Agricultura de Barcelona, Polytechnic University of Catalonia.

== Career ==
=== Arquitectura Agronomia ===
Galí-Izard is principal of ARQUITECTURA AGRONOMIA, a landscape architecture firm founded in 2007 with Jordi Nebot located in Barcelona. Over the past 20 years she has been involved in landscape architecture projects in Europe including TMB Park, Coastal Park, the new urbanization of Passeig de Sant Joan in Barcelona and the Sant Joan Landfill restoration, which won the European Urban Public Space award in 2004. She has been selected as a finalist in major landscape competitions in Spain such as Cañaveral Park in Madrid and Central Park in Valencia.

Arquitectura Agronomia has a number of built projects in Spain including San Telmo Palace garden in Sevilla, Arriaga Lake in Vitoria, Odesa Park in Sabadell, Logroño Train Station park, Casabermeja Park in Malaga, Desierto square in Bilbao, Auditorium Park in Barcelona with FOA, Cordelles Garden and Giner de los rios Garden in Madrid. Built work in South America includes Parque de los primeros pasos in Caracas, Venezuela.

From 1989 to 2003, she worked as a freelance landscape architect under the Roach Batlle (Batlle i Roig Arquitectes) in Barcelona. She opened her own design office in 1995, prior to founding Arquitectura Agronomia.

Gali-Izard maintains collaborations with many architecture firms including FOA, AZPA, Rogers Stick Harbour and Partners, Vazquez Consuegra, Abalos-Sentkiewicz. Past collaborators include Eduardo Soto de Moura, Kengo Kuma, Eduardo Arroyo, RCR, and UNstudio.

=== Academia ===
Gali-Izard has taught in both the United States and Europe. She was appointed as Full Professor of Landscape Architecture at the Institute for Landscape and Urban Studies (I-LUS) at ETH Zurich in 2019, initiating the masters program in landscape architecture. Gali-Izard was Associate Professor of Landscape Architecture at Harvard University Graduate School of Design from 2018-2019. She was Associate Professor of Landscape Architecture at University of Virginia from 2012-2018 and Chair of the Department of Landscape Architecture from 2013-2015. She has previously taught in the Master’s program in Landscape Architecture and Environment at the Escuela Técnica Superior in Madrid and Universitat Politècnica de Catalunya and has lectured in the School of Architecture of Oslo in Norway, the Akademie der Bildenden Künste in Austria, the Academy of Architecture of Mendrisio in Switzerland, the School of Architecture of Grenoble University in France, and the Oporto School of Architecture in Portugal.

== Selected bibliography ==
She is author of The same landscapes. Ideas and interpretations, 2006 Ed. Gustavo Gili, editor with Daniela Colafrancesci of Jacques Simon: The other landscapes. Ideas and thoughts on the territory, 2012 Ed. Libria and Regenerative Empathy, a Harvard University Graduate School of Design studio report published in 2019. Gali-Izard authored the chapter "Eight Concepts" in Suprarural: Architectural Atlas of Rural Protocols of the American Midwest and the Argentine Pampas by Ciro Najle and Lluis Ortega.

=== Articles on the work of Arquitectura Agronomia ===
- Free Spaces and Rooftop of the AVE Station in Logroño Nuevas naturalezas. La Estación Intermodal de Logroño. Madrid: Q! estudio, 2013.
- Palacio de San Telmo. La Coruña: Labirinto de Paixons, 2013.
- El Palacio de San Telmo. Recuperado. Sevilla: Junta de Andalucía, 2010.
- El Dipòsit controlat de la Vall d’En Joan. AMB (Àrea Metropolitana de Bcn), Barcelona, 2007.
- Krauel, Jacobo. Landscape : arquitectura del paisaje. Barcelona: Broto i Comerma, 2006. arq./a, nº 27, Sep-oct 2004, p. 44-49.
- Quaderns d'arquitectura i Urbanisme, nº 243, 2004, p. 48-57.
- On : Diseño, nº 252, 2004, p. 310-319.
- TMB Park in Horta. Paisajismo Urbano. Barcelona, Ajuntament de Barcelona 2012, p. 204-209.
- TMB Park in Horta. Tectónica Espacios exteriores, nº 30, 2009, p. 36-53.
- TMB Park in Horta. Quaderns d'arquitectura i Urbanisme, nº 243, 2004, p. 60-62.
- South-West Coastal Park Forum 2004. Arquitectura Viva, nº 84. May-jun 2002, p. 23-75.
- South-West Coastal Park Forum 2004. ON: diseño, nº 255, 2004, p. 256-269.
- South-West Coastal Park Forum 2004. arq./a, nº 27, Sep-oct 2004, p. 54-59.
- Desierto Square. 2G Monographic Eduardo Arroyo, nº 41, 2007, p. 34-45.
- Park Cordelles. Quaderns d'arquitectura i Urbanisme, nº 243, 2004, p. 63.
- Turull Garden. Quaderns d'arquitectura i Urbanisme, nº 243, 2004, p. 58-59.
- Cantarell Garden. ON: diseño, nº 203, 1999, p. 154-159.
- Hill, Penelope. Contemporary History of Garden Design. European Gardens between Art and Architecture. Basel: Birkhäuser, 2004, p. 174-176.
