= Bob Izzard =

Australian rugby league footballer

Personal information
- Full name: Robert Hector Izzard
- Born: 11 January 1914 Chatswood, New South Wales, Australia
- Died: 1 June 1969 (aged 55)

Playing information
- Position: Wing
Club
Years	Team	Pld	T	G	FG	P
1935	North Sydney	5	2	0	0	6
- Source: As of 5 May 2020

Bob Izzard was an Australian rugby league footballer who played in the 1930s. He played for the North Sydney club of the New South Wales Rugby Football League premiership. His usual position was at wing.

== Playing career ==
Izzard made his first grade debut for North Sydney against Canterbury-Bankstown in round 1 of the 1935 season at North Sydney Oval. His final game for Norths was in round 16 of the same year against Eastern Suburbs where North Sydney were thrashed 53–15 at the Sydney Cricket Ground.
