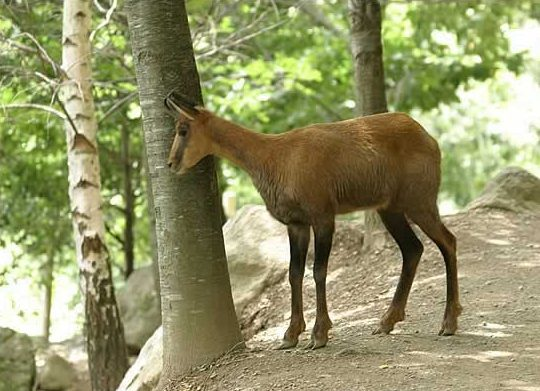

Conservation status
- Least Concern (IUCN 3.1)

Scientific classification
- Kingdom: Animalia
- Phylum: Chordata
- Class: Mammalia
- Order: Artiodactyla
- Family: Bovidae
- Subfamily: Caprinae
- Genus: Rupicapra
- Species: R. pyrenaica

Binomial name
- Rupicapra pyrenaica (Bonaparte, 1845)
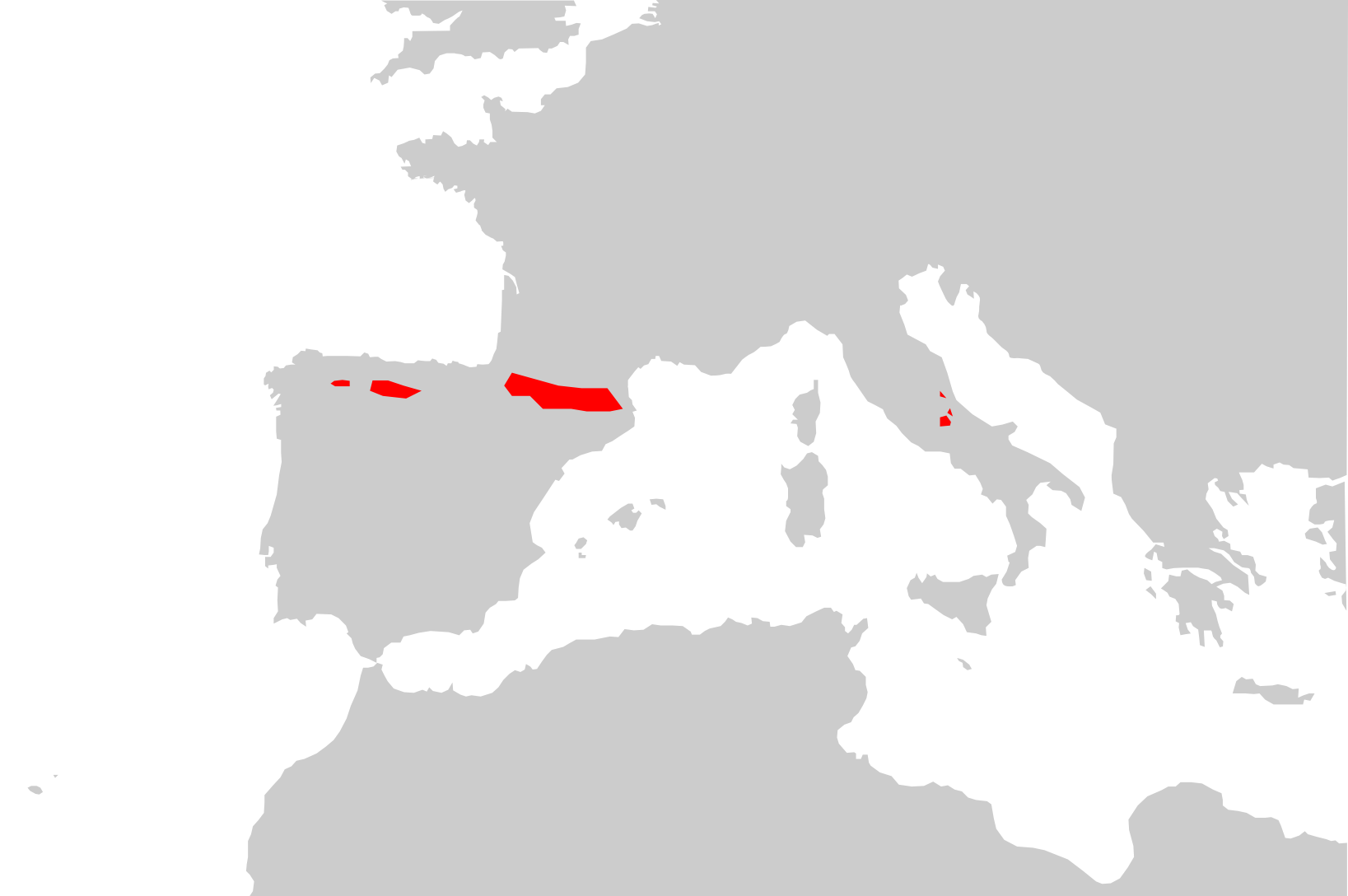
- Distribution of Pyrenean chamois

= Pyrenean chamois =

Species of mammal

The Pyrenean chamois (Rupicapra pyrenaica) is a goat-antelope that lives in the Pyrenees and Cantabrian Mountains of Spain, France and Andorra, and the Apennine Mountains of central Italy. It is one of the two species of the genus Rupicapra, the other being the chamois, Rupicapra rupicapra.

== Names ==
- Aragonese: sarrio, chizardo
- Asturian: robecu/robezu
- Basque: Pirinioetako sarrioa
- Catalan: isard
- French: izard/isard
- Galician: rebezo
- Italian: camoscio dei Pirenei, camoscio appenninico
- Occitan: isard, sarri
- Spanish: rebeco, gamuza

== Subspecies ==
Image	Subspecies	Distribution
	R. p. pyrenaica (Pyrenean chamois)	Andorra, France and Spain
	R. p. parva (Cantabrian chamois)	Spain
	R. p. ornata (Abruzzo chamois)	Central and southern Italy

== Description ==
Up to 80 centimetres (31 inches) tall, its summer coat is a ruddy brown; in winter, it is black or brown, with darker patches around the eyes. Both males and females have backward-hooked horns up to 20 centimetres (8 inches) in length. They browse on grass, lichens and buds of trees. Sure-footed and agile, they are found on any elevation up to 3,000 metres (9,800 ft).

== Conservation ==
Like other species of chamois, it was hunted almost to extinction, especially in the 1940s, for the production of chamois leather. The population has since recovered, and in 2022 was estimated to be about 50,000 mature individuals.
