= Buru (legendary creature) =

Apatani myth

Creature information
- Other name(s): bura, buro, bru

Origin
- Country: India
- Region: Arunachal Pradesh
- Details: Marsh

The buru or bura is an aquatic cryptic animal featured in a foundation myth of the Apatani people. Stories of the migration of the Apatani to their present location in the Ziro Valley of Arunachal Pradesh tell of a swamp occupying the valley, inhabited by fierce, crocodile-like creatures. Draining the swamp and destroying the creatures allowed them to cultivate fertile paddy fields and settle the valley.

In 1945 and 1946, James Philip Mills and Charles Stonor gathered details about the buru from the Apatani people. According to the Apatani elders, when their forefathers migrated to Ziro Valley, the valley was primarily a marsh which was populated by burus. The Apatani people decided to settle in the valley because of its fertility and good climate. They would occasionally have confrontations with burus. The burus were ostensibly eliminated when the Apatani people drained the wetlands to facilitate rice cultivation. Most of the burus died because of the drainage, and many supposedly went underground into the springs.

In 1947, Professor Christoph von Furer-Haimendorf was another westerner to be told about the buru. By that time, the animals had reportedly already become extinct in the valley.

The last buru was said to be reported by a young woman, who sighted it in a spring one night while she was drawing water. The startled lady told her father about the incident. The next day the whole village helped fill the spring with stones and clay.
