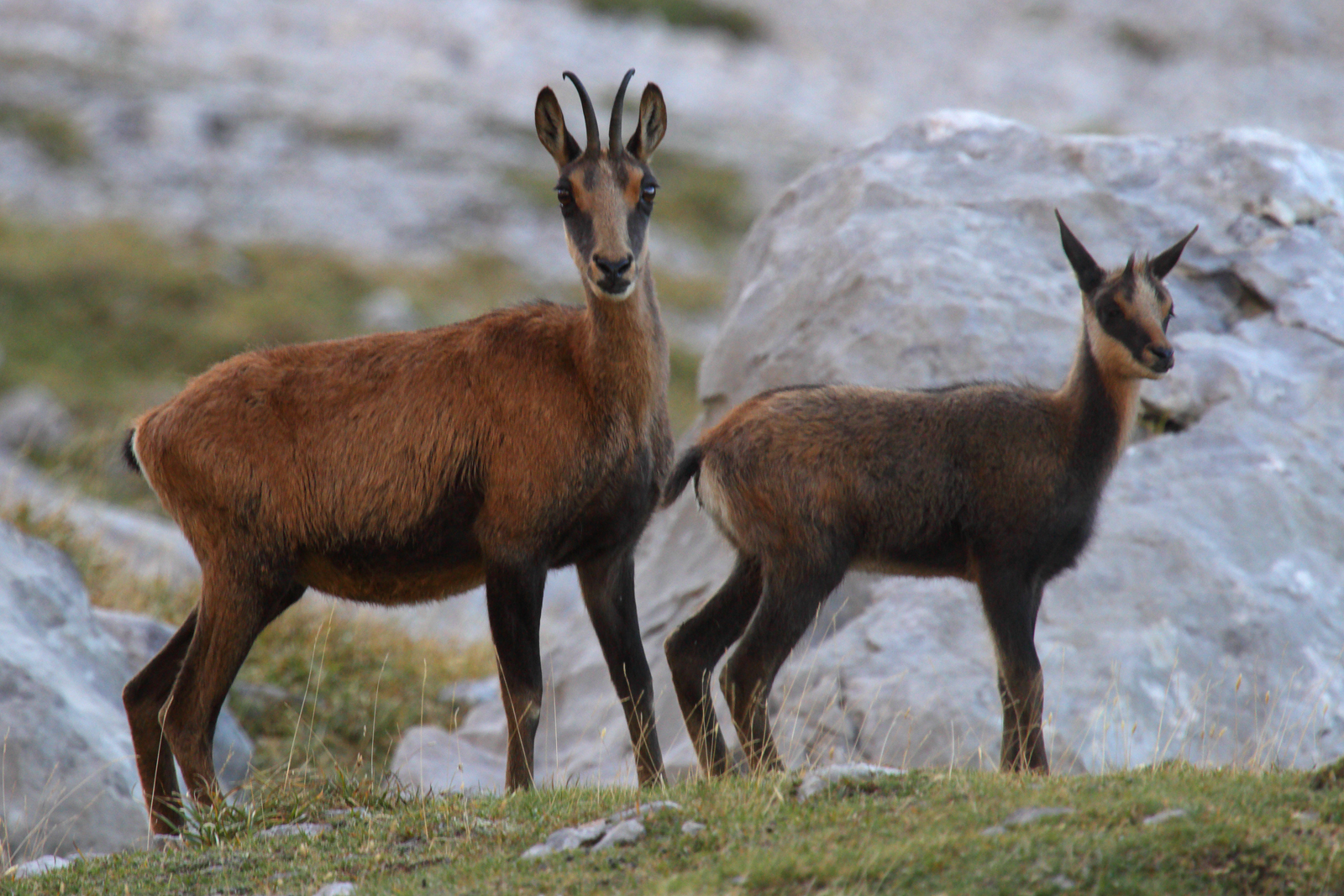

Conservation status
- Least Concern (IUCN 3.1)

Scientific classification
- Kingdom: Animalia
- Phylum: Chordata
- Class: Mammalia
- Order: Artiodactyla
- Family: Bovidae
- Subfamily: Caprinae
- Genus: Rupicapra
- Species: R. pyrenaica
- Subspecies: R. p. parva

Trinomial name
- Rupicapra pyrenaica parva (Cabrera, 1914)
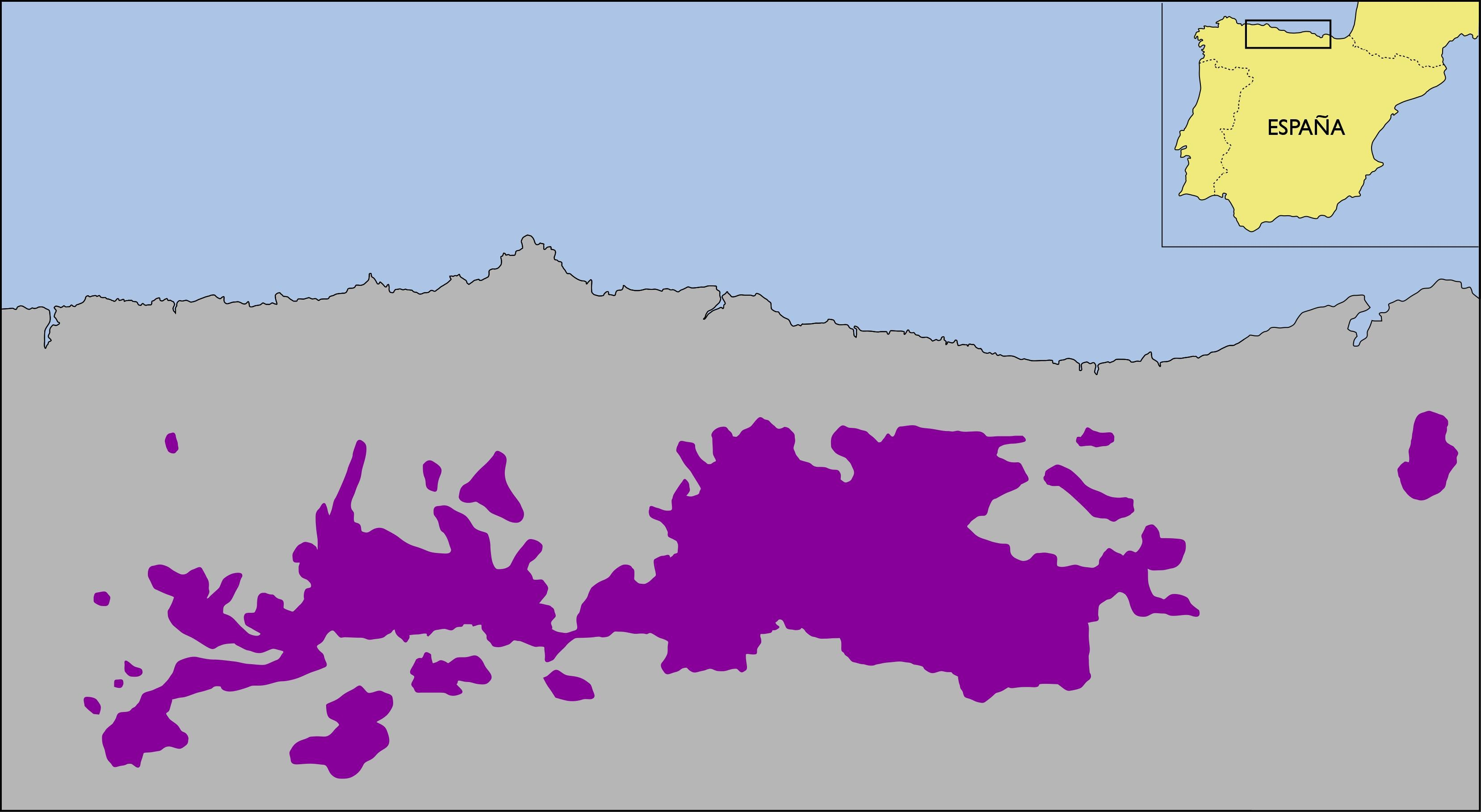
- Distribution of Cantabrian chamois in 2008.

= Cantabrian chamois =

Subspecies of mammal

The Cantabrian chamois (Rupicapra pyrenaica parva) is a slim mountain goat-antelope, and is one of the 10 subspecies of the genus Rupicapra. It ranges the Cantabrian Mountains in northern Spain, with a population of 17,000 animals in 2007-2008.

== Taxonomic classification ==
The systematic of the species is still under discussion. Ángel Cabrera (1914), on studying the body shape and skull morphology, considered this taxa so similar to the Pyrenean chamois as to be of the same species. Lovari (1987), using morphology, genetic and ethology data proposed to separate the southwestern European animals (of the Cantabrian Mountains and Pyrenees, Rupicapra pyrenaica parva, R.p. pyrenaica), from the rest of the European and Asian animals (Rupicapra r. cartusiana -Chartreuse Mountains-, Rupicapra r. rupicapra -Alps-, Rupicapra r. tatrica -Tatra Mountains-, Rupicapra r. carpatica -Romania-, Rupicapra r. balcanica -Balkans-, Rupicapra r. asiatica -Turkey- y Rupicapra r. caucasica -Caucasus Mountains). Different genetic studies still argue over the taxonomy of the species.

== Spanish vernacular names ==
This species is called rebeco, rebeco cantábrico, gamuza, robezu (in the Asturias region), and rebezo or camurza (in the Galicia region).

== Identification ==
The Cantabrian chamois is a slim bovid the size of a domestic goat. Both sexes have peculiar hooked horns (more hooked and thicker in males than in females).

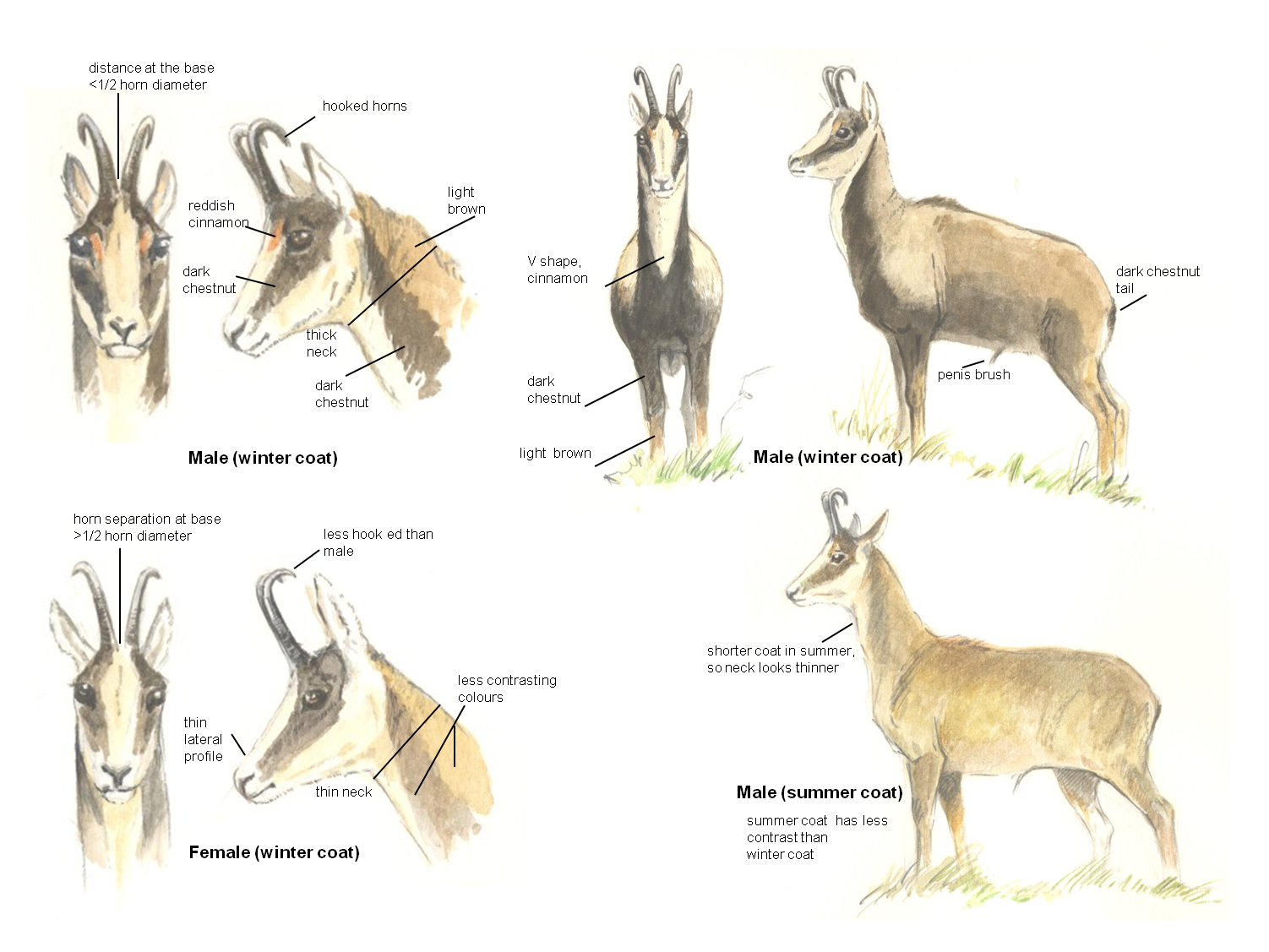
Identification of sex and winter and summer coats in Cantabrian chamois.

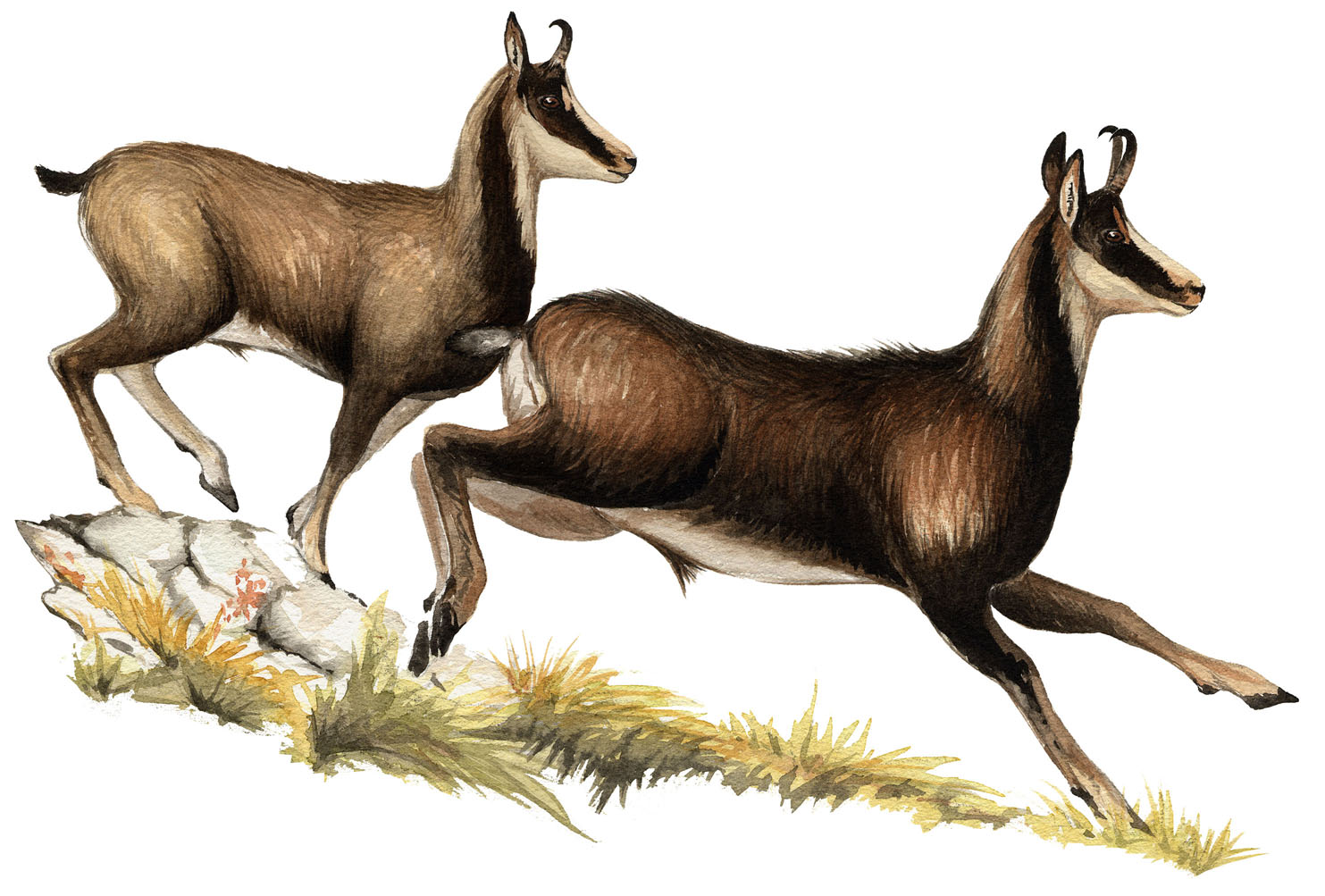
Male Cantabrian chamois in winter coat (left: in its second year of age; right: adult).

The horns have a transversal segmentation pattern due to seasonal growth (winter-summer). The head, throat and cheeks are a light cinnamon colour with a dark mask design that crosses the big eyes. The back, chest, legs and flanks are dark brown, while the shoulders and hindquarters are pale brown. In winter, the back and belly become paler in colour and the flanks darker, giving a more contrasting colour pattern. Juveniles exhibit a less contrasting colour pattern.

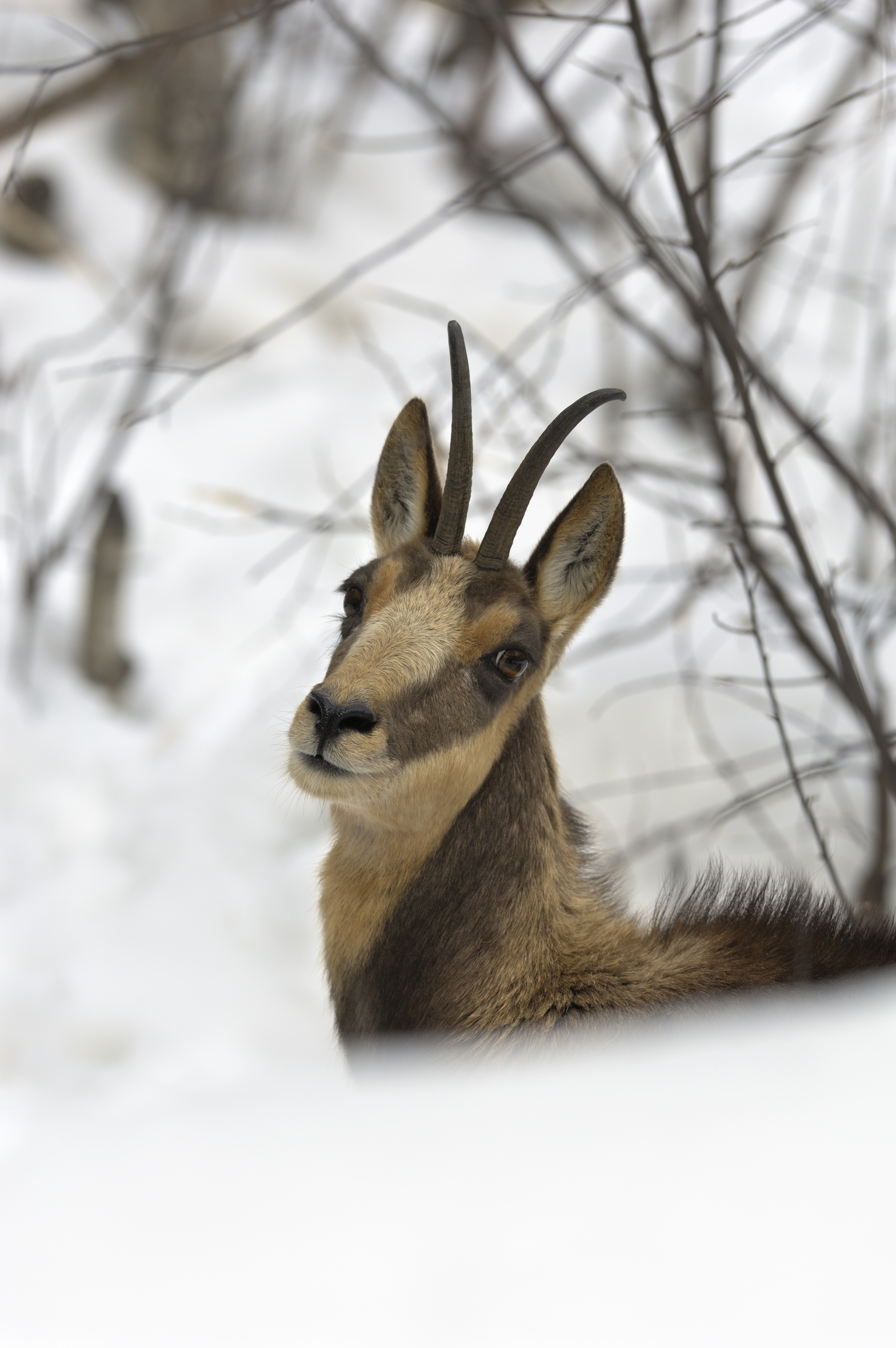
Facial pattern of a female Cantabrian chamois in winter coat.

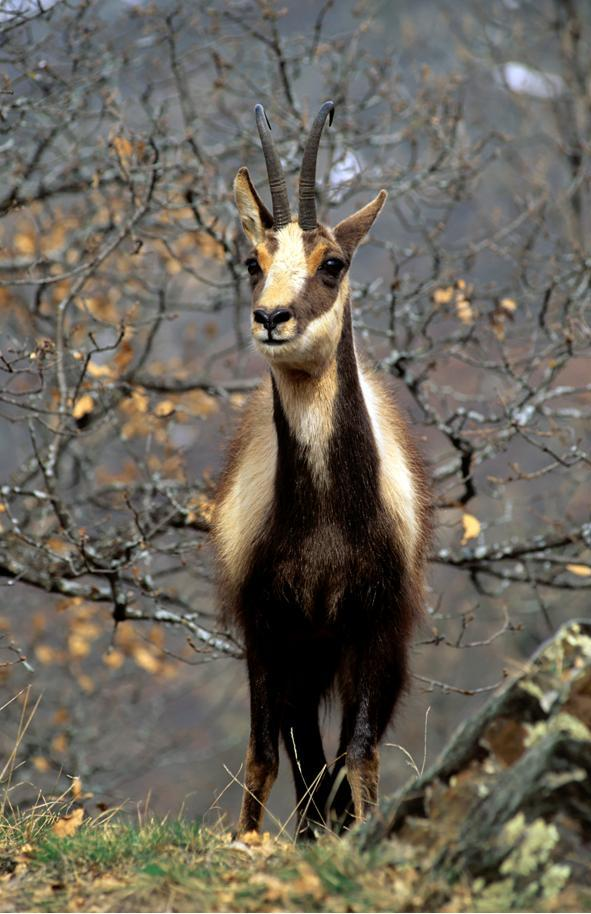
Winter coat

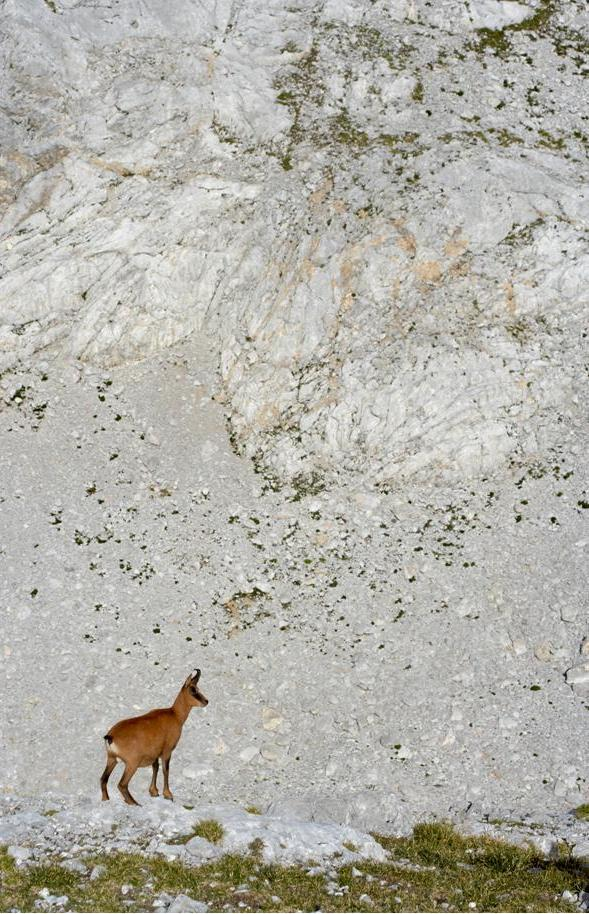
Summer coat

Male in winter (left) and summer coat (right). Summer coat is paler and less contrasted than winter coat.

== Measurements ==
- Weight: 24–30 kg.*
- Head-tail length: 100–104 cm.*
- Shoulder height: 72–74 cm.*
- Hind leg length: 32–34 cm.*
- Chest perimeter: 71–77 cm.*
- Jaw length: 13.7-13.9 cm.*

(*) Female and male measurements, respectively.

== Longevity ==
- Males: mean = 9 yr, max = 18 yr.
- Females: mean = 10 yr, max = 21 yr.

== Dental equation ==
I (0-0)/ (3-3), C (0-0)/(1-1), PM (3-3)/(3-3), M (3-3)/(3-3) = 32.

== Distribution ==
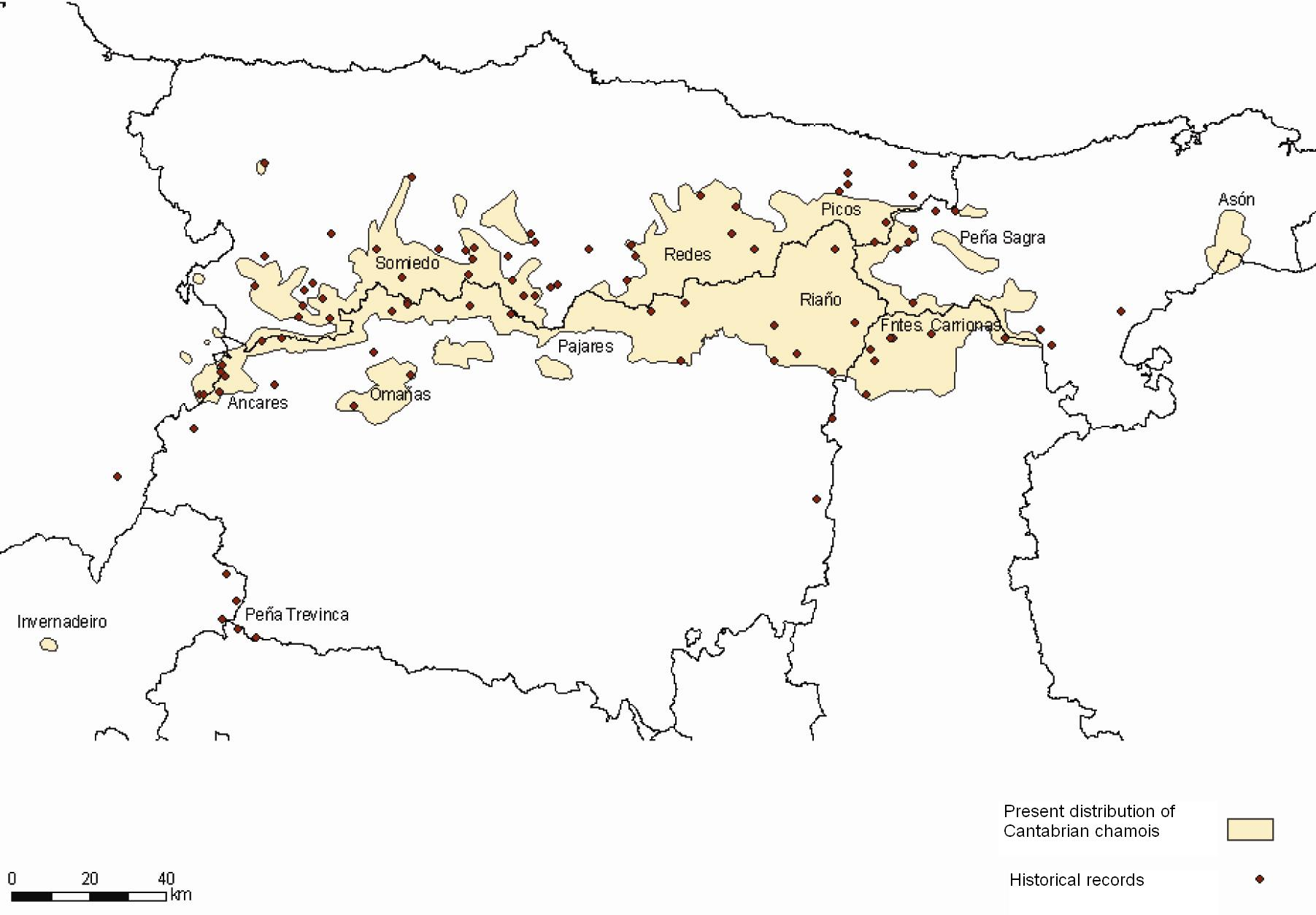
Distribution of Cantabrian chamois in 2008. Dots are records of the presence of the species during the nineteenth century.

Cantabrian Mountains (North West, Spain). From East Saja Reserve and Alto Asón (Cantabria) to West Ancares Reserve (Lugo, Galicia). Species distribution shrank in historical time. The Cantabrian Mountains are situated in the north-west of the Iberian Peninsula, running 450 km East-West, parallel to the Cantabrian Sea and very close to the coastline (max. altitude 2648 m.a.s.l.). The north catchment is very wet (2000 mm/year) and the south catchment has a continental climate, dry and hot in summer and dry and cold in winter.

== Habitat ==
Subalpine, preference for the ecotone between forest and alpine meadow, with nearby cliffs as refuge-escape areas.

== Food ==
Grasses year-round with an increase in the proportion of dwarf shrubs in winter (Calluna vulgaris, Erica cinerea, Erica arborea).

== Reproduction ==
Only one offspring/year (May–June, first births in the middle of May). Females sexually mature at 3 yr old and fertile until at least at 14 yr old.

== Behaviour ==
Gregarious. Group size (2-55, median = 6.5). The only stable social unit is mother-offspring that can last until the offspring is 2 yr old.

== Population size and historic evolution of the population ==
17400 chamois in 2007-2008. Historical minimum population size is unknown but it took place between 1943 and 1966. After the last Ice Age, R. pyrenaica occupied most of the Iberian Peninsula. During the Neolithic it was present as far south as the provinces of Teruel, Valencia, Jáen (Segura Mountains) and Granada (600 km south of the present distribution range). It maintained the occupation of the southern range at least until the Bronze Age 5000 yr BC. Written records indicate that by 1800 the distribution was restricted to the north of the Iberian Peninsula, from the north of Burgos to the Zamora provinces. Excessive game hunting, together with the proliferation of long distance rifles, drove the population size to minimum numbers, this happened between 1943 and 1966. The population started to increase with the creation of protected areas (National Game Reserves) and establishing gamekeepers for the first time.

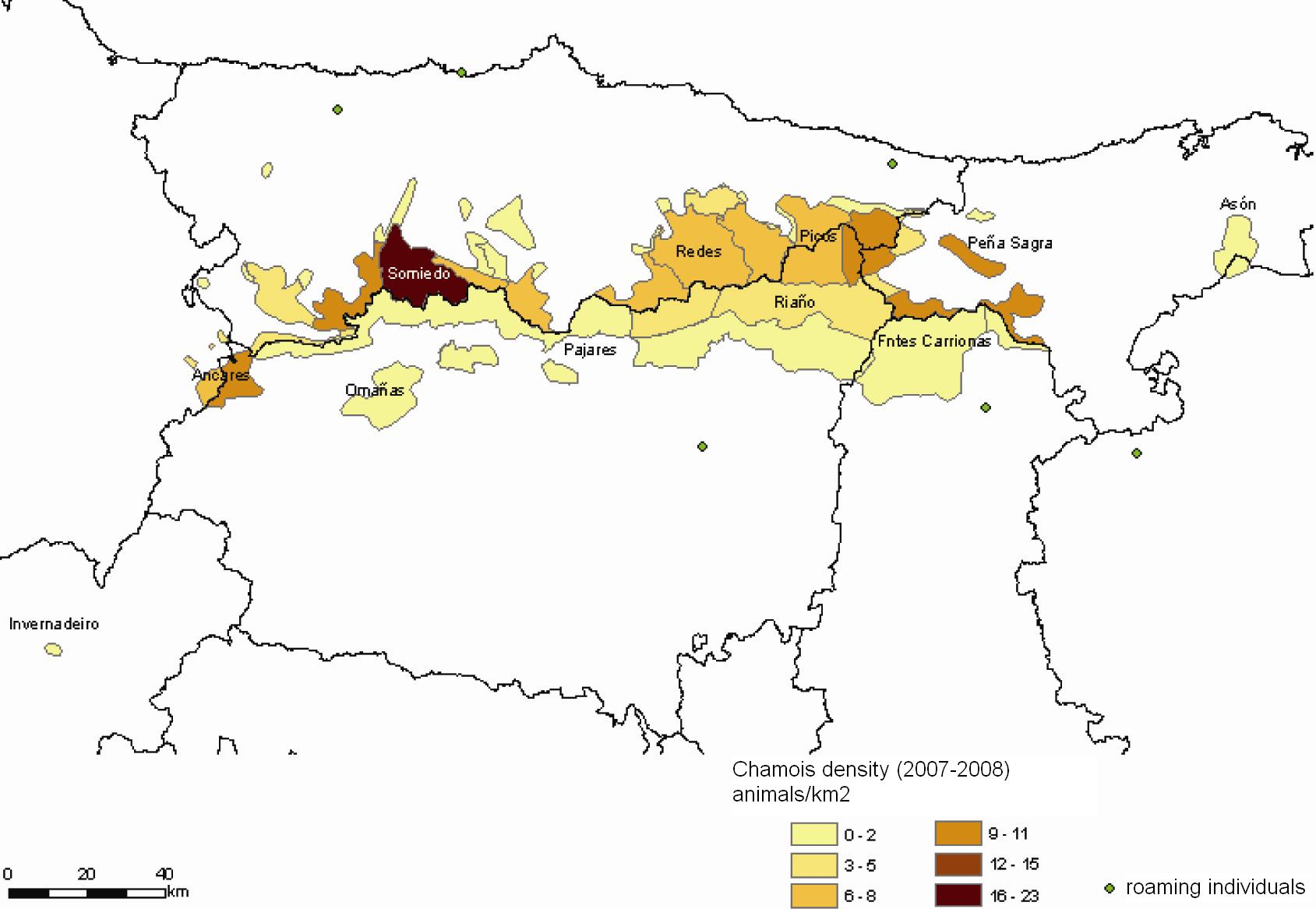
Distribution area of the Cantabrian chamois and abundance (chamois/km2) estimated in 2007-2008. Isolated points indicate sporadic observations of roaming chamois.

== Predators and threats ==
Adults are predated only by wolf. Kids can be predated by wolf, fox and golden eagle. Epizootic diseases, such as sarcoptic mange, are a serious threat. Sarcoptic mange is caused by the Sarcoptes scabies acari, which causes damage and itchiness in the skin of a large number of ungulate species worldwide. It can cause death by affecting body condition and inducing severe stress. The greatest changes in the Cantabrian chamois population size have taken place since 1995. In this year an outbreak of mange (originally detected 2 years before, in the south-center of Asturias and north-center of Leon) seriously affected the populations of these areas. Fifteen years after the outbreak (1993-2008) the disease had spread about 40 km east, an average of 2.6 km/yr. In 2009 only the population at the west side of the outbreak focus was free of the disease. The disease may not have spread into the west population due to the very low population densities in the areas that separate the west from the east populations. In 2008, 56% of the whole population and 60% of the distribution range was affected by the disease. The mange is continuing to spread as of 2010.

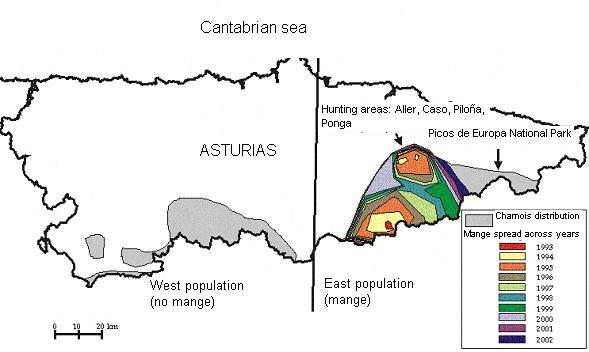
Sarcoptic mange in Cantabrian chamois spread across Asturias between 1993-2002.

== Reintroductions ==
Although the first reintroduction initiatives started in 1970, reintroduction programs were not successful until the 1980s. These programs have extended the distribution range in the east and west, where very low densities of chamois made the natural recolonization of these areas difficult.
