= Junta Nacional de Homologación de Trofeos de Caza =

Trophy hunting governing body in Spain

Junta Nacional de Homologación de Trofeos de Caza National Board of Trophy Hunting Homologation

- Upper: Seal of the Junta de Homologación; Lower: Seal of the Spanish delegation of the CIC
- Formation: 1950
- Headquarters: Avenida Gran Vía de San Francisco, 4 Madrid; 28005; Spain
- President: The Marquess of Valdueza
- Parent organization: Ministry of Agriculture, Fisheries and Food
- Affiliations: International Council for Game and Wildlife Conservation
- Website: Website of the Ministry

The Junta Nacional de Homologación de Trofeos de Caza (JNHTC, English: National Board of Trophy Hunting Homologation) is the governing body for the control and assessment of trophy hunting in Spain, a branch of the Ministry of Agriculture. It was founded in 1950 and first presided by Eduardo de Figueroa, 8th Count of Yebes. Since 1999, the President is Alonso Álvarez de Toledo, 12th Marquess of Valdueza, who has also served as vice-president of the International Council for Game and Wildlife Conservation and was the head of the Spanish delegation.

The origins of the Junta can be found in 1950, when a group of Spanish noblemen, namely the Marquess of Valdueza and the counts of Yebes, Villada and Seefried designed formulas to establish a valuation of big game trophies by points.

The success of the 1950 Trophy Exhibition held in Madrid encouraged the Administration to officially recognise those who had carried out the technical work, thus establishing the Junta Nacional de Homologación de Trofeos de Caza y Estadística Cinegética, which was assigned to the Superior Council of Continental Fishing, Hunting and National Parks.

Since its creation, the Junta has published catalogues every quinquennium listing every measured medal trophy of the more than a dozen big game species that can be hunted in Spain (it has recently included the Balearean boc and excluded the Iberian lynx and the Cantabrian brown bear since 1973). These include the Spanish wolf, wild boar, Iberian red deer, fallow, roe, sarrio, rebeco, Iberian ibex, mouflon, arruí and Balearean boc. As of April 2019, more than 80,000 trophies had been registered by the Junta as having been awarded a gold, silver or bronze medal.

== Functions ==
The Junta is the body in charge of the control, measurement and assessment of hunting trophies in Spain. It is an organism with deep institutional roots, with more than 50 years of existence at the service of hunting activity, in the classification and homologation of the biometric characteristics of the different species.

Hunting, like all forest harvesting, is an inherent part of the economic activity of the forestry sector under the jurisdiction of the Ministry de Agriculture, Fishing, Nutrition and Environment, due to its link to both rural development and nature conservation policies.

It defines the valuation formulas corresponding to each species, adjusting as far as possible those adopted by the International Council for Game and Wildlife Conservation (CIC), and establishes the minimum scores required for the different categories (Gold, Silver and Bronze).

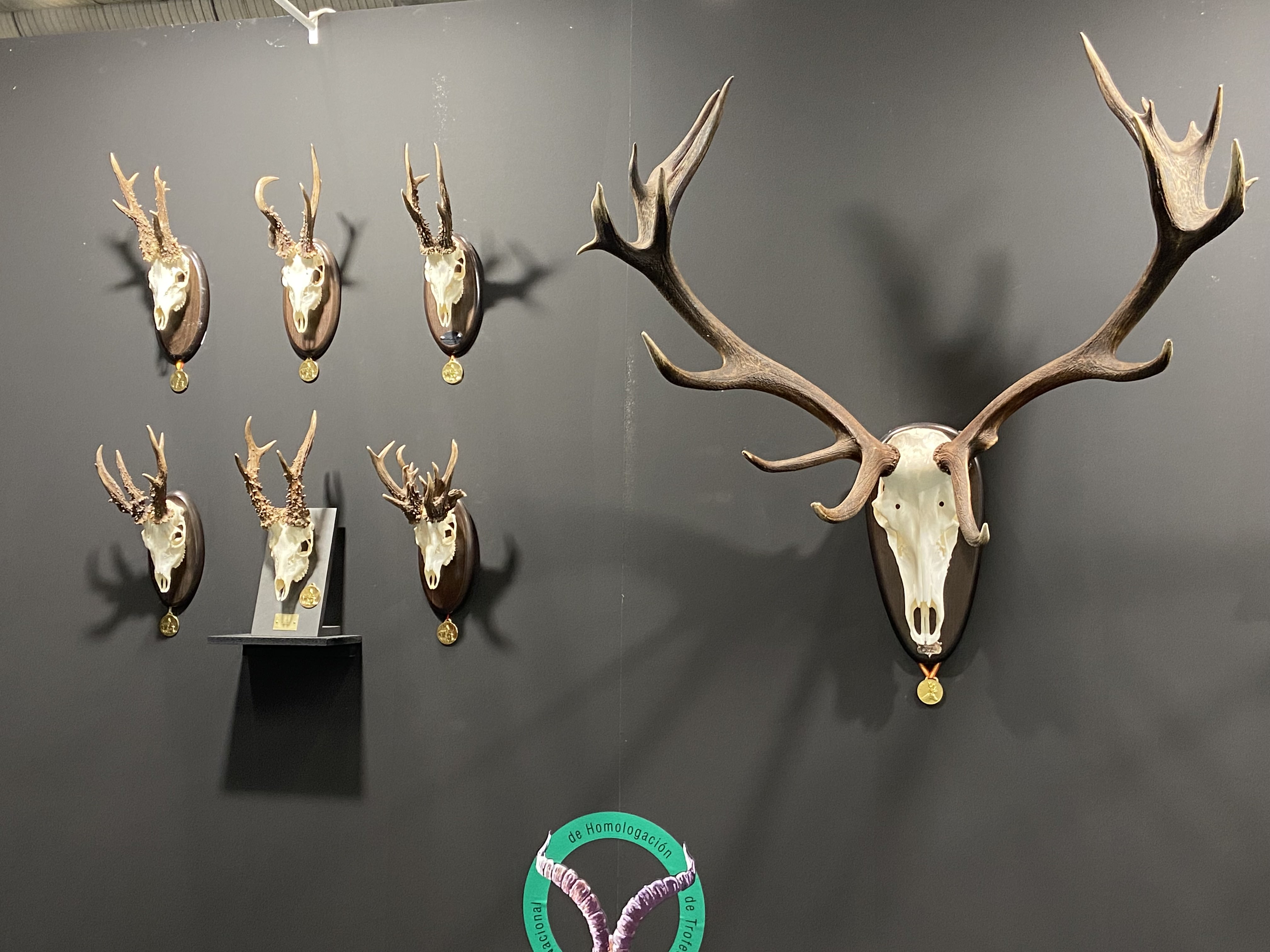
A series of gold medal roe and red deer trophies in typical Spanish taxidermy, measured by the Junta at IFEMA's wildlife fair "Cinegética"

It has the following functions:

1. Cooperate for the correct application of said formulas, promoting the unification of interpretation criteria among the approval committees of the different Autonomous Communities, preferably attending to the criteria defined by the CIC.
2. Define the procedures for the homologation of trophies to access the lists of the National Archive of Hunting Trophies, while defining the concepts of National Record of each species, absolute historical record or any other that the Board may consider appropriate to stimulate the management of hunting wealth based on a sustainable use of hunting resources.
3. Define the trophy cataloging systems and promote and promote the coordination of these systems between the different approval committees of the Autonomous Communities in order to consolidate the cataloging in the National Archive of Hunting Trophies.
4. Facilitate the exchange of information and records of the National Archive of Hunting Trophies with each of the homologation commissions of the Autonomous Communities when required.
5. Maintain close collaboration with international organizations responsible for tasks similar to those of the Board.
6. Act as an advisory body in the field of hunting, hunting management and conservation of ecosystems for the General State Administration and for the different Autonomous Communities.
7. Inform the General Directorate of Rural Development and Forest Policy regarding matters related to big game that could affect more than one Autonomous Community, either at its request or on its own initiative, and propose the measures it deems appropriate.
8. Propose to the General Directorate for Rural Development and Forest Policy the renewal, increase or decrease of its members when circumstances require it, as well as the appointment of collaborating advisers.
9. Measure and approve all kinds of Spanish hunting trophies, both in official competitions and exhibitions and at the request of the owners, and issue the supporting documents for the approvals carried out, without prejudice to the powers of the autonomous communities.
10. Prepare the catalogs of hunting trophies, in which the homologated trophies will be collected and as many data as necessary in order to highlight the evolution and development of the different species.
11. Ensure the protection of the biological diversity of the Spanish hunting fauna and, in particular, for its genetic purity.
12. Value the hunting resources existing in Spain and making these values transcend the existing international organizations in the matter.

== Measurable species ==
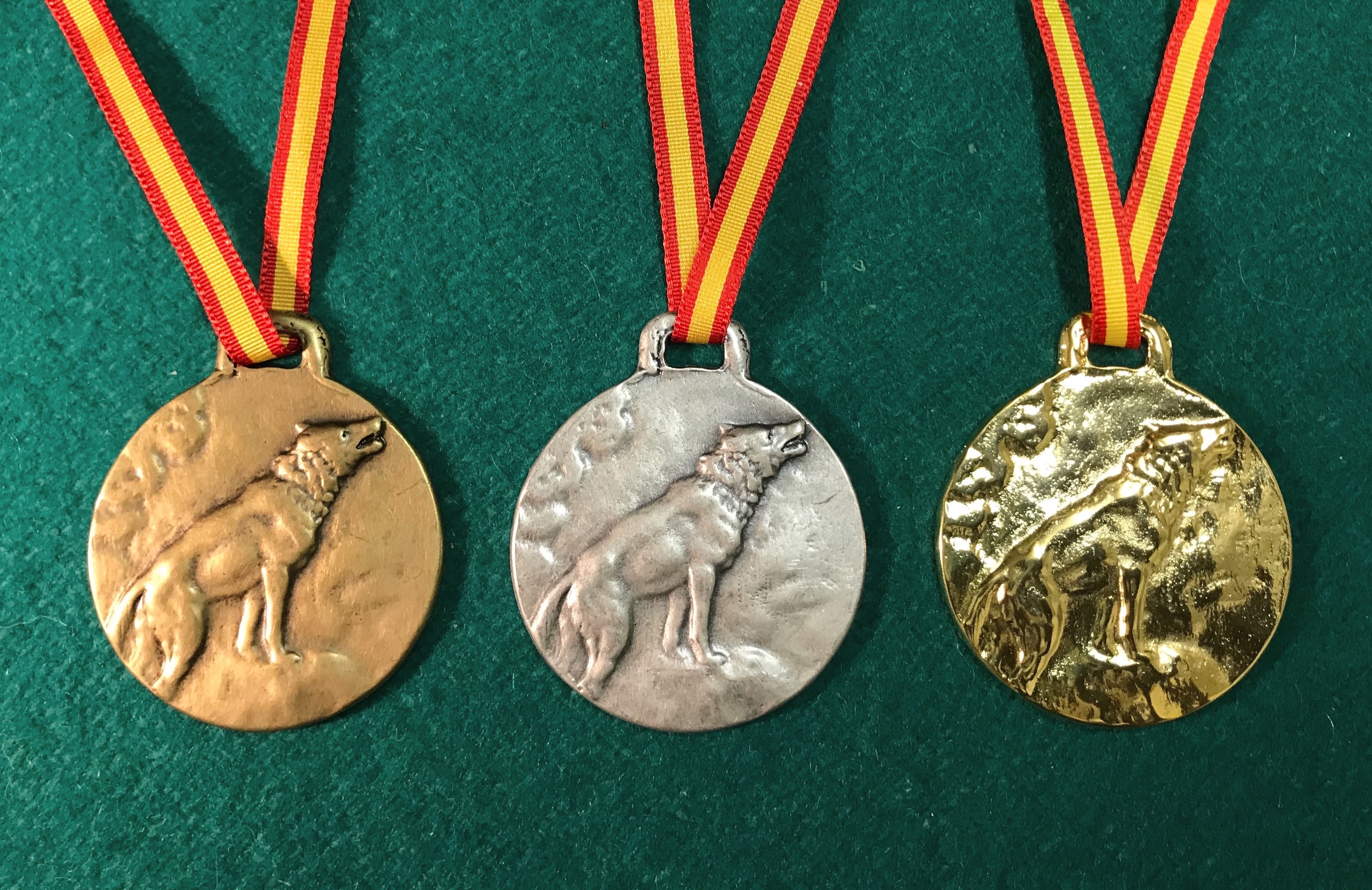
Rare Junta medals for the Iberian wolf species (bronze, silver and gold). During the period 2006–2010, only 43 were granted in total

The following is a list of all the big-game species in Spain that are currently or have in the past been measured. The Junta has excluded the Cantabrian brown bear and the Iberian lynx since 1973 (due to their hunting prohibition). Below is the official benchmark of points to assess whether the hunted animal in question qualifies as gold, silver or bronze medal. Only a small percentage of hunted animals in Spain is worthy of a medal, which the Junta measures in accordance to the CIC.

If a trophy is awarded any of the three available medals, it will be published in the Junta catalogues that are produced every five-year periods, with relation to the species, the hunter and the finca or national park it was harvested in. For instance, the Duke of Württemberg harvested a 223,35 point (silver medal) Iberian ibex in Gredos National Park in 1977, which at the time placed him 204th on the national ranking.

To date, only four people have hunted all big-game species in the fauna of Spain: the marquesses of Villaviciosa de Asturias and Valdueza, Carlos Rein and Infanta Alicia of Spain, as a privilege of a time when no species were protected.

=== Iberian wolf ===
- Gold medal: 41
- Silver medal: 39 - 40,99
- Bronze medal: 37 - 38,99

Iberian wolf ranking (top 10)

No.	Hunter	Date	Estate/National Park	Province	Points	Medal	
1	José Luis Santos Díez	27/11/1970	Navamartina	Jaén	43,75		*Current World Record
2	Diego Otero Pérez	07/12/2004	Pedroso	Lugo	43,50		
3	Samuel Romano López-Flores	11/09/1970	Los Alarcones	Jaén	43,20		
4	Francisco José Semuelas	24/12/2007	Villar de los Pisones	Zamora	42,80		
5	Junta of Castile and León	24/11/2006	Santa Elena de Jamuz	León	42,80		
6	José Manuel Gamero Cívico	28/01/1969	Las Umbrías	Seville	42,75		
7	Jacinto Sánchez Maza	22/09/1998	R.N. de Riaño	León	42,50		
8	José Méndez Barroso	21/11/1980	Manca y Mingolla	Cáceres	42,50		
9	Sabino Santos Parrilla	12/01/2002	Viaducto de Agavanzal	Zamora	42,40		
10	José V. de Soto	30/09/2000	El Carrascal	Palencia	42,30		

=== Wild boar ===
- Gold medal: 110
- Silver medal: 105 - 109,99
- Bronze medal: 100 - 104,99

Wild boar ranking (top 10)

No.	Hunter	Date	Estate/National Park	Province	Points	Medal
1	Tomás Higuero de Juan	12/02/1983	Palomares-San Simón	Cáceres	136,95	
2	Agustín Calderón Calderón	30/11/2002	R.R. de Cameros-Demanda	La Rioja	132,93	
3	Francisco Sáiz Herrera	12/02/1983	Mata de Pedro	Soria	132,44	
4	Carlo C. Bononi	08/12/2001	Monte del Duque	Málaga	131,08	
5	José M. López Pérez	14/12/2003	Sierra de la Espada	Murcia	130,29	
6	José Antonio Sáez Royuela	01/12/1968	R.N. Sierra de la Demanda	Burgos	129,20	
7	Jesús Martín-Sanz	15/08/2002	Briones-Peralberche	Guadalajara	129,18	
8	Alfredo Nieto T.	25/08/2004	Paraje Entreaguas	Guadalajara	129,10	
9	Aitor Eransus	12/10/2005	Uli	Navarre	128,80	
10	José Maldonado M.	11/02/2006	Losilla y Veguilla de Bujeda	Guadalajara	128,55	

=== Fallow deer ===
- Gold medal: 180
- Silver medal: 170 - 170,99
- Bronze medal: 160 - 169,99

Fallow deer ranking (top 10)

No.	Hunter	Date	Estate/National Park	Province	Points	Medal
1	Javier Corsini Freese	26/09/1998	La Alcaría	Cádiz	224,77	
2	Antonio Hernández Alonso	08/11/2000	La Alcaría	Cádiz	216,13	
3	María Cabanyes Pineda	11/11/1953	Viñuelas	Madrid	214,13	
4	Juan Antonio Mozos B.	20/09/2005	La Alberquilla	Toledo	213,21	
5	Francisco Ostos de la Serna	12/10/1998	Navas de San Luis	Málaga	213,17	
6	Manuel Fraga Iribarne	19/09/1998	Mata Del Moral	León	212,81	
7	Jesús Ortiz Collado	11/12/2006	La Caleruela	Toledo	212,41	
8	Juan Abelló Gallo	30/08/1995	Ballesteros	Toledo	212,08	
9	Luis Mac-Crohon Garay	01/09/2003	Revilla de la Cañada	Ávila	211,98	
10	Jesús Gracia Vidal	23/09/2004	La Alcaría	Cádiz	211,33	

=== Iberian red deer ===
- Gold medal: 181
- Silver medal: 173 - 180,99
- Bronze medal: 165 - 172,99

Iberian red deer ranking (top 10)

No.	Hunter	Date	Estate/National Park	Province	Points	Medal	
1	The Marquess of Real Socorro	01/09/2016	La Corchera	Madrid	249,27		*Current World Record
2	José Recio Lozano	20/09/2010	El Pimpollar	Seville	235,43		
3	Juan Abelló Gallo	11/09/2004	El Palomar	Albacete	228,87		
4	H.M. The King of Spain	06/09/2004	La Ermita	Madrid	223,81		
5	H.M. The King of Spain	24/09/2000	El Palomar	Albacete	223,72		
6	Antonio Fernández Díez	30/09/2000	Mata del Moral	León	222,58		
7	Esteban Iglesias de Sena	04/10/2015	Lanseros	Zamora	222,38		
8	Víctor Colino Blasco	26/01/2008	Peñas Amarillas	Ciudad Real	222,30		
9	Francisco Diezma Rodríguez	17/11/2002	La Alberquilla	Toledo	220,91		
10	Agropecuaria Sierra Morena, S.L.	01/01/2004	El Palomar	Albacete	219,89		

=== Roe deer ===
- Gold medal: 130
- Silver medal: 115 - 129,99
- Bronze medal: 105 - 114,99

Roe deer ranking (top 10)

No.	Hunter	Date	Estate/National Park	Province	Points	Medal	
1	Sergio Muela García	09/06/2016	La Nava de Jadraque	Guadalajara	250,00		*Current World Record
2	Alberto Cortina Alcocer	01/05/2008	Las Cuevas	Ciudad Real	229,83		
3	J.R.T.	07/05/2015	Undisclosed	Zaragoza	227,48		
4	Carlos Guindo López	02/07/2017	Salmeroncillo	Cuenca	223,53		
5	Agustín Torrego Casado	14/05/2002	Hontoria del Pinar	Burgos	215,53		
6	Antonio Regalado Corisco	05/04/2009	Burbagena	Teruel	214,74		
7	Daniel Serrano Lara	17/10/2001	Valdevetalla	Burgos	214,40		
8	Carlos Escarza Blas	27/07/2015	Redecilla del Camino	Burgos	211,90		
9	José Manuel Gimeno Bernal	01/05/2005	La Casa	Zaragoza	210,30		
10	Pedro Mateache Sacristán	06/06/1999	Riba de Santiuste	Guadalajara	207,85		

=== Sarrio ===
==== Male ====
- Gold medal: 97
- Silver medal: 92 - 96,99
- Bronze medal: 87 - 91,99

Male sarrio ranking (top 10)

No.	Hunter	Date	Estate/Natural Park	Province	Points	Medal	
1	Jordi Boix Alabau	25/05/1999	R.N. de Alto Pallars-Arán	Lleida	113,38		*Current World Record
2	Josep María Farras Gispert	10/11/2004	La Vansa i Fórnols	Lleida	112,78		
3	José Ramón de Camps Galobart	22/07/2014	R.N.C. de Freser-Setcases	Girona	112,22		
4	Francisco Javier Semelas	07/11/2003	R.N. de Alto Pallars-Arán	Lleida	112,05		
5	Juan Hernández Madrid	24/12/2009	Oden	Lleida	111,10		
6	Juan Hernández Madrid	20/10/2010	Cambrils	Lleida	110,10		
7	José Gallego Palacios	12/11/2016	Cers	Barcelona	109,67		
8	Jaume Blanque Gil	11/11/2003	Moripol	Lleida	109,53		
9	Emilio Alloza M.	01/11/1988	R.N. del Cadí	Barcelona	109,15		
10	Jordi Baux Alabau	17/11/2008	R.N.C. de Freser-Setcases	Girona	108,60		

==== Female ====
- Gold medal: 93
- Silver medal: 88 - 92,99
- Bronze medal: 83 - 87,99

Female sarrio ranking (top 10)

No.	Hunter	Date	Estate/Natural Park	Province	Points	Medal	
1	Jordi Baux Alabau	03/11/2008	R.N.C. de Freser-Setcases	Girona	99,95		*Current World Record
2	Francisco Torres Real	14/04/2005	Basella	Lleida	99,12		
3	Jordi Boix Alabau	01/10/2004	R.N. del Cadí	Barcelona	98,95		
4	Pedro Isern Pascal	08/11/1980	R.N.C. de Freser-Setcases	Girona	98,85		
5	The Viscount of Belloch	01/10/1976	R.N. de Alto Pallars-Arán	Lleida	98,10		
6	Jordi Boix Alabau	01/11/1992	R.N. de Alto Pallars-Arán	Lleida	97,95		
7	Jordi Boix Alabau	01/10/1997	Capdella	Lleida	97,58		
8	Emilio Alloza Muniesa	21/11/1990	R.N. del Cadí	Barcelona	97,40		
9	Ana Navarro Moreno	07/10/1994	Capdella	Lleida	97,10		
10	Jordi Boix Alabau	01/09/1997	Capdella	Lleida	96,88		

=== Rebeco ===
==== Male ====
- Gold medal: 85
- Silver medal: 81,5 - 84,99
- Bronze medal: 78 - 81,49

Male rebeco ranking (top 10)

No.	Hunter	Date	Estate/Natural Park	Province	Points	Medal	
1	The Marquess of Santo Floro	11/11/2012	Foradada del Toscar	Huesca	110,65		*Current World Record
2	Antonio Pérez Mariscal	05/09/2006	Valdeteja	León	94,29		
3	Salvador Pascual Tamrit	25/10/2001	R.N. del Saja	Cantabria	94,02		
4	José Luis Rodríguez Gregores	20/10/1990	Muniacos y Semeldón	Asturias	93,62		
5	Álvaro Argüelles Martínez	05/11/1975	Puropinto y Fresnedal	Asturias	93,45		
6	Juan Antonio García Paz	20/11/1974	Sobrescobio	Asturias	92,50		
7	Alfredo Martínez Pérez	26/09/1982	R.N. de Picos de Europa	Asturias	92,18		
8	José María Fernández G.	17/10/1988	R.N. de Fuentes Carrionas	Palencia	91,70		
9	Alberto Borés	01/01/1969	Rivera del Carrión	Palencia	91,70		
10	Jaime González Fernández	16/09/1995	R.N. de Riaño	León	91,53		

==== Female ====
- Gold medal: 81
- Silver medal: 77,5 - 84,99
- Bronze medal: 74 - 77,49

Female rebeco ranking (top 10)

No.	Hunter	Date	Estate/Natural Park	Province	Points	Medal	
1	Carlos Vicente Rivera Blanco	02/09/2006	Valleras	León	92,62		*Current World Record
2	Dirección General de Medio Natural	25/11/2000	R.N. de Riaño	León	90,88		
3	Valentín de Madariaga Oya	15/10/1994	Pandemules	Asturias	89,50		
4	Fernando Sáinz Quintana	13/11/1979	La Lluesa	León	85,97		
5	Alfonso Couret Storich	21/11/2006	R.N. de Benasque	Huesca	85,95		
6	Daniel Ruiz Pita	04/10/1975	R.N. de Redes	Asturias	85,92		
7	Enrique Longares	07/10/1970	R.N. de Riaño	León	85,80		
8	Alfonso Pérez Andújar	01/12/1982	Ponga	Asturias	85,72		
9	Juan P. García Lomas	12/12/1977	Ponga	Asturias	85,50		
10	Primitivo de la Quintana López	24/09/1975	R.N. de Redes	Asturias	85,40		

=== Iberian ibex ===
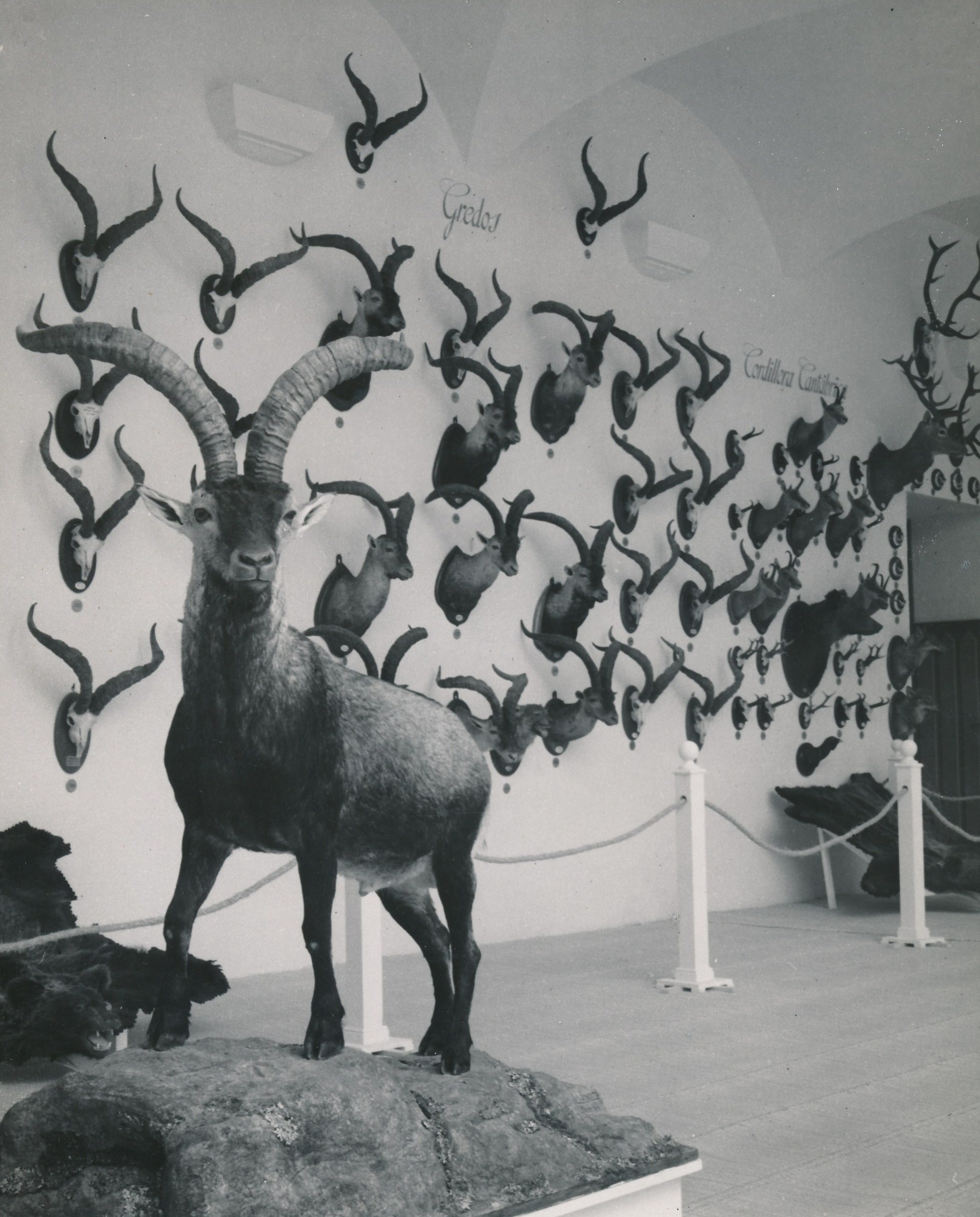
1950 Trophy Hunting Exhibition of the Junta de Homologación in Madrid. At the forefront, a full-length Iberian ibex standing

==== North zone ====
For those harvested in the provinces of Ávila, Burgos, León, Salamanca, Segovia, Zamora, Cáceres (north of River Tagus), Madrid, Lugo, Ourense, Asturias, Tarragona, Barcelona, Castellón and Teruel.

- Gold medal: 230
- Silver medal: 220 - 229,99
- Bronze medal: 205 - 219,99

==== Mid zone ====
For those harvested in the provinces of Valencia, Alicante, Murcia, Albacete, Ciudad Real, Cuenca, Guadalajara, Toledo, Cáceres (south of River Tagus) and Zaragoza.

- Gold medal: 225
- Silver medal: 215 - 224,99
- Bronze medal: 205 - 214,99

==== South zone ====
For those harvested in the provinces of Almería, Cádiz, Córdoba, Granada, Jaén, Málaga y Seville.

- Gold medal: 220
- Silver medal: 210 - 219,99
- Bronze medal: 195 - 209,99

Iberian ibex ranking (top 10)

No.	Hunter	Date	Estate/National Park	Province	Points	Medal	
1	Great Spanish Hunts, S.L.	27/05/2012	La Umbría	Jaén	311,47		*Current World Record
2	Great Spanish Hunts, S.L.	23/03/2012	R.R.C. de Riaño	León	300,39		
3	Garganta de Gredos, S.L.	15/12/2011	Garganta de Gredos	Cáceres	300,20		
4	H.M. The King of Spain	13/05/2005	La Umbría	Jaén	298,26		
5	Jesús Montaner Fragüet	19/05/2005	R.N. de Riaño	León	295,03		
6	H.M. The King of Spain	22/06/1996	R.N. de las Batuecas	Salamanca	288,50		
7	The Marquess of Pardo de Figueroa	16/10/2009	R.R.C. de Riaño	León	288,10		
8	H.M. The King of Spain	10/03/1989	R.N. de las Batuecas	Salamanca	287,90		
9	H.M. The King of Spain	01/01/2002	Garganta de Gredos	Cáceres	286,39		
10	Marcial Gómez Sequeira	01/05/1990	R.N. de las Batuecas	Salamanca	281,23		

=== Mouflon ===
- Gold medal: 205
- Silver medal: 195 - 204,99
- Bronze medal: 185 - 194,99

Mouflon ranking (top 10)

No.	Hunter	Date	Estate/National Park	Province	Points	Medal
1	José Luis Martín Tomás	27/10/1991	Los Claros	Ciudad Real	230,10	
2	Enrique Albert Soriano	05/02/2005	Mingorramos	Jaén	229,80	
3	Álvaro Sáinz de Vicuña Bemberg	15/08/2002	Dehesa de las Cañadas	Seville	228,33	
4	Álvaro Sáinz de Vicuña Bemberg	28/09/2002	Charco Redondo	Seville	228,20	
5	Miguel Higuero Zúñiga	30/11/2007	Charco Redondo	Seville	227,55	
6	Juan Martín Gómez	01/06/2003	La Gamonosa	Seville	226,25	
7	Florentino Romero R.	18/01/2003	Dehesa del Caballero	Segovia	225,10	
8	Enrique Ponce Martínez	30/09/1999	El Palomar	Albacete	224,25	
9	Ángel Luis Redondo Abad	06/10/2003	La Alberquilla	Toledo	223,65	
10	Adolfo Suárez Illana	20/10/2001	El Palomar	Albacete	223,00	

=== Arruí ===
- Gold medal: 350
- Silver medal: 330 - 349,99
- Bronze medal: 310 - 329,99

Arruí ranking (top 10)

No.	Hunter	Date	Estate/National Park	Province	Points	Medal
1	Jesús Franco Muñoz	14/12/1997	El Retorno	Valencia	370,05	
2	H.M. The King of Spain	01/04/2000	El Tochar	Valencia	359,50	
3	Agustín García Álvaro	22/11/1994	El Tochar	Valencia	359,00	
4	Alberto Roemmers	26/10/1980	R.N. Sierra Espuña	Murcia	358,00	
5	Arturo Santos Tejedor	21/12/1999	El Tochar	Valencia	357,10	
6	Luis Gimeno Planes	16/01/2001	El Tochar	Valencia	355,80	
7	Marcial Gómez Sequeira	15/10/1997	Quinto Bocanegra	Ciudad Real	355,30	
8	Enrique Reyes	14/02/2004	La Loma	Alicante	354,10	
9	Pedro Mateache Zubiete	06/02/2000	El Coto	Cáceres	353,50	
10	H.M. The King of Spain	02/04/2000	El Retorno	Valencia	353,00	

=== Balearean boc ===
- Gold medal: 310,00
- Silver medal: 290,00 - 309,99
- Bronze medal: 270,00 - 289,99

Balearean boc ranking (top 10)

No.	Hunter	Date	Estate/Natural Park	Province	Points	Medal	
1	Daniel Anthony Peyerk	2010	La Victòria	Mallorca	347,80		*Current World Record
2	Bartolomé Llompart Pascual	2008	La Victòria	Mallorca	343,40		
3	José Manuel Olabarría García	2008	La Victòria	Mallorca	342,90		
4	Juan Martínez del Barrio	2008	La Victòria	Mallorca	341,10		
5	Charlotte Marie Peyerk	2010	La Victòria	Mallorca	339,80		
6	Víctor Blanquer Grande	2008	La Victòria	Mallorca	335,50		
7	Ramón Estalella Halffter	2008	La Victòria	Mallorca	319,80		
8	Miguel Ángel Borges Sanguino	2009	La Victòria	Mallorca	318,60		
9	Francisco Caballero Puig	2008	La Victòria	Mallorca	318,00		
10	Enrique Pérez Zárate	2009	La Victòria	Mallorca	315,60		

=== Cantabrian brown bear ===
- Gold medal: 51,01
- Silver medal: 47,01 - 51,00
- Bronze medal: 42,01 - 47,00

Cantabrian brown bear ranking (top 10)

No.	Hunter	Date	Estate/Natural Park	Province	Points	Medal	
1	José Rubio Sañudo	1965	R.N. de Somiedo	Asturias	56,90		*Current World Record
2	The Marquess of Valdueza	03/10/1945	R.N. de Somiedo	Asturias	55,00		
3	H.R.H. The Duchess of Salerno	1962	R.N. de Somiedo	Asturias	54,10		
4	José Maria Anchisi y de Góngora	1970	R.N. de Somiedo	Asturias	50,70		
5	Servicio de Pesca Continental, Caza y Parques Naturales	1970	R.N. de Somiedo	Asturias	50,30		
6	Fernando Fuentes	1970	R.N. de Somiedo	Asturias	48,90		
7	Ignacio Pidal Bermejillo	1970	R.N. de Somiedo	Asturias	48,10		
8	Dolores Sainz de Aznar	1970	R.N. de Somiedo	Asturias	47,60		
9	Carlos Celaya	1970	R.N. de Somiedo	Asturias	47,40		
10	Juan Velasco	1970	R.N. de Somiedo	Asturias	47,20		

=== Iberian lynx ===
- Gold medal: 23,01
- Silver medal: 21,51 - 23,00
- Bronze medal: 19,01 - 21,50

Iberian lynx ranking (top 10)

No.	Hunter	Date	Estate/Natural Park	Province	Points	Medal	
1	José María Moreno Yagüe	20/10/1965	El Cortijillo	Toledo	23,65		*Current World Record
2	Andrés de la Plaza	09/09/1967	Fresnedas Altas	Ciudad Real	23,60		
3	Alfredo Martín-Cubas	1970	La Caleruela	Toledo	23,20		
4	José Ignacio Villalonga	1970	Gargantilla	Toledo	23,15		
5	Emilio Cano	1970	El Sauceral	Toledo	23,00		
6	Antonio Ancarso Carazo	1970	Valdelagrana	Jaén	23,00		
7	Emilio Cano	1970	El Sauceral	Toledo	22,90		
8	The Count of Caralt	1970	Lugar Nuevo	Jaén	22,70		
9	Rafael Müller Astoreca	1970	El Soto	Toledo	22,50		
10	H.R.H. The Duke of Calabria	1961	Valdecasillas	Toledo	22,50		

== Governing body ==
=== President ===
- The Marquess of Valdueza

=== Vice-president ===
- Valentín Almansa de Lara

=== Spokesmen ===
- The Viscount of Salinas
- Cástor Cañedo Angoso
- Juan Luis Oliva de Suelves Cazurro
- Juan del Yerro San Román
- José Luis López-Schümmer Treviño
- Francisco Landaluce Domínguez
- Jorge Bernad Danzberger
- The Duke of Algeciras
- Juan José Viola Cardoso
- Luis de la Peña Fernández-Nespral
- Jose Ignacio Crespo Fernández
- Jose Manuel Jaquotot Sáenz de Miera
- Jose Hernández Fernández
- Adolfo Díaz-Ambrona Medrano
- Ángel Fernández Díaz
- Guillermo Ceballos Watling
- Roberto González Hernando

=== Secretary ===
- Carlos Guillén del Rey

== Timeline of presidents ==
- 1950 – 1979 The Count of Yebes
- 1979 – 1982 Adolfo Domínguez Merelles
- 1982 – 1990 The Marquess of Laula
- 1990 – 1999 Juan Luis Oliva de Suelves
- 1999 – The Marquess of Valdueza

== Territorial delegations ==
Autonomous Community	Commission	Webpage
Castile and León	Comisión de Homologación de Trofeos de Caza de Castilla y León	medioambiente.jcyl.es
Catalonia	Comisión de Cataluña de Homologación de Trofeos de Caza	gencat.cat
Valencian Community	Comisión Valenciana de Homologación de Trofeos de Caza	dogv.gva.es
Community of Madrid	Comisión de Homologación de Trofeos de Caza Mayor de la Comunidad de Madrid	comunidad.madrid
(Basque Country (autonomous community)) Basque Country	Comisión de Homologación de Trofeos de Caza de la Comunidad Autónoma del País Vasco	euskadi.eus

== See also ==
- Hunting in Spain

== Bibliography ==
- Homologación de Trofeos, Junta Nacional de (1973). III Catálogo General de Trofeos de Caza. Imprenta Agi.
- Homologación de Trofeos, Junta Nacional de (1988). IV Catálogo General de Trofeos de Caza; 1975-1984. Petróleos del Mediterráneo, S.A. (PETROMED). ISBN 84-404-1941-4.
