= Hunting in Spain =

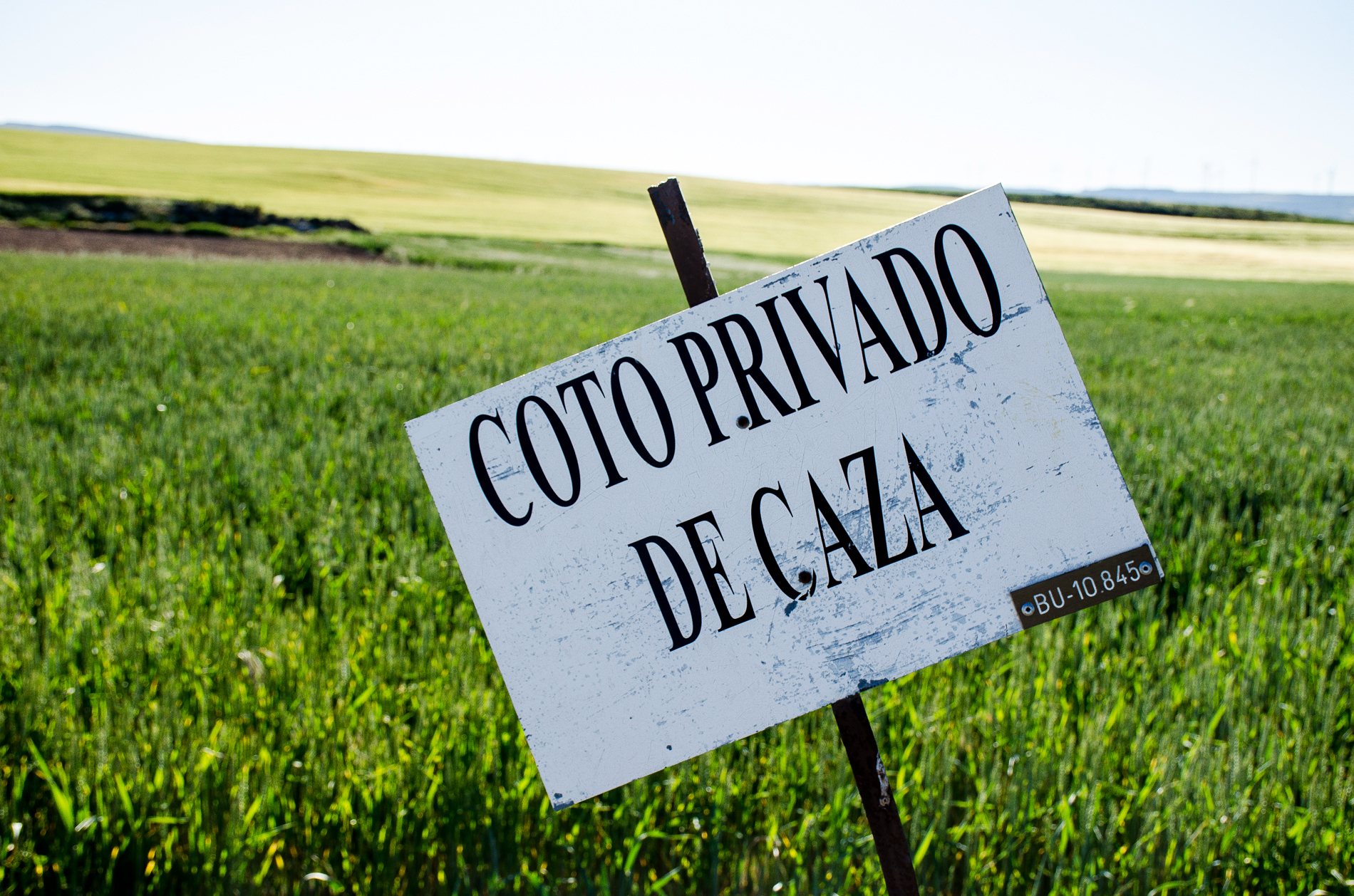
A sign delimiting the perimeter of a private hunting ground in Castile and León

Hunting in Spain is a significant regulated subsistence and recreational activity in Spain with a long-recorded history. It is widely considered one of the most relevant hunting destinations in the world, backed by the variety of its species, climates, terrains as well as sheer size and relatively low density of human population. With almost 1 million licenses in 2017, it is the second country with most hunters in Europe. Internationally, it is also the second country that imports most big-game hunting trophies from overseas after the United States.

Hunting is regulated and administered by the Ministry of Agriculture, which oversees its correct functioning. The Junta Nacional de Homologación de Trofeos de Caza is the governing body for the control and assessment of trophy hunting, in charge of measuring them and granting gold, silver or bronze medals to the more exceptional harvested animals, broadly in line with the CIC guidelines.

Spain offers a variety of different big-game species, most commonly the Spanish red deer, fallow, roe, Iberian ibex and its four subspecies, mouflon, arrui, Pyrenean and Cantabrian chamois and boc. Cantabrian brown bears and Iberian lynxes have been protected since the 1970s after almost becoming extinct, and more recently the Socialist government of Pedro Sánchez oversaw the protection of the Iberian wolf, whose hunting north of the Douro river was legal until 2021.

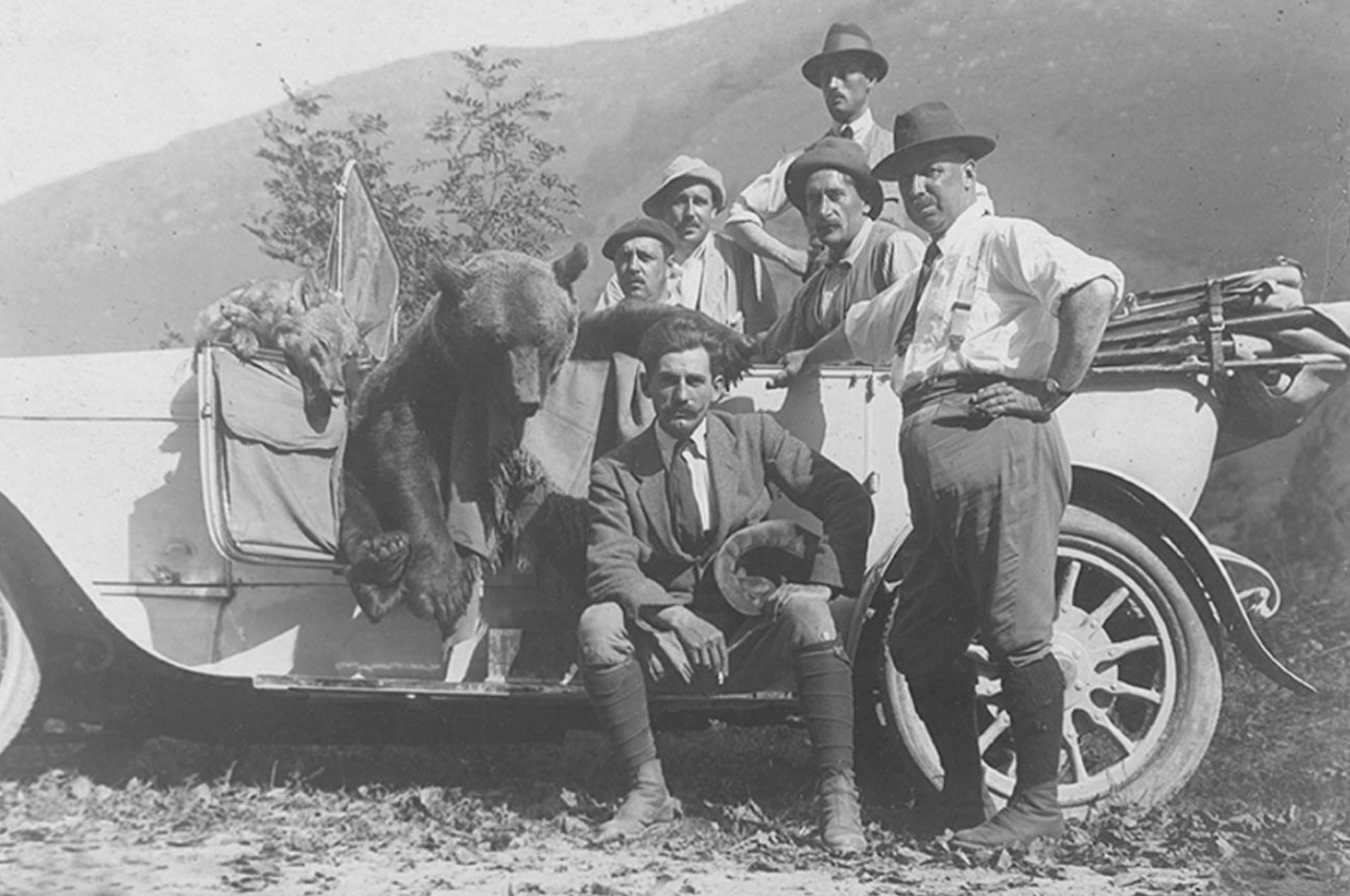
A group of hunters with an Iberian wolf and Cantabrian brown bear at a hunt in Picos de Europa National Park in 1919

Some of the most popular small-game species include the red-legged partridge, duck, hare, rabbit, woodcock, pheasant and the red fox. The iconic Cantabrian grouse was protected in the second half of the 20th century.

The two most common modalities of hunting are monterías (big-game) which take place from mid October until end of February, and regular stalking (both big and small-game) which can be practiced regularly throughout the year, with some exceptions such as the month of March.

Almost 85% of Spain is officially declared as 'hunting grounds', and in 2020 there were 32,187 hunting grounds (both public and private) in which 17 million animals were harvested. The total spending in hunting in Spain was €5.5 billion in 2016, equivalent to €6.5 billion when calculated as gross domestic product (0.3% of the total Spanish GDP for that year) with a tax revenue generation of €614 million and supporting almost 200,000 full-time equivalent jobs.

== History ==
In the Neolithic, and with the discovery of agriculture, humans became sedentary and a significant change occurred in their way of hunting. Where previously humans had only hunted for food, they were now hunting to protect their cattle and crops from other predators.

In the Middle Ages, hunting became a privilege as it was an activity enjoyed by kings and nobility, and this continued even well into the arrival of the industrialization in the 19th century.

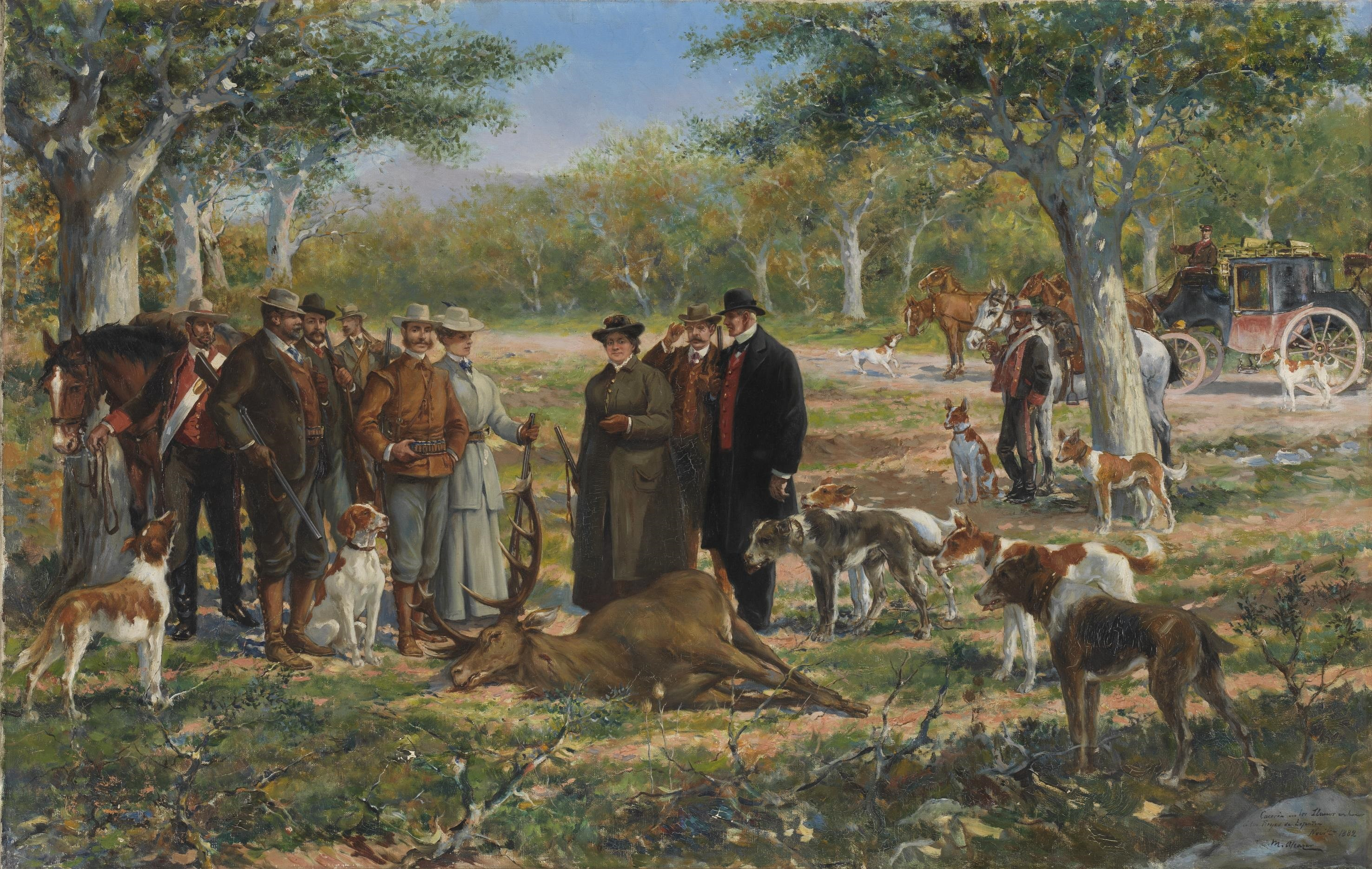
Isabella II and her son Alfonso XII at a hunt in Albacete, 1881

In the 20th century, the decades of the 1940s and 1950s saw big-game hunting continuing to be somewhat elitist, while small-game was abundant across all sectors of society. With the devastation of the country after the Spanish Civil War, hunting allowed thousands of families to feed themselves and survive the terrible conditions of poverty and famine. Although in 1946 only 140,000 hunting licenses had been issued, hunting was socially well regarded even if conducted in absence of a licence.

In the 1960s and 1970s, big game-hunting began to grow at an abnormal rate on the back of increasing incomes and hunting demand. Hunting was beginning to be seen as an activity that served as a fund to foster human, political and financial relations. In these decades the infrastructure began to be improved and the first fenced fincas (estates) and even the first partridge farms appeared. In 1970 the ambitious "Ley de Caza" (hunting law) was introduced. With the establishment of this law, more hunting reserves were created, stricter calendar seasons implemented and allowed species and numbers limited. The "Ley de Conservación de Espacios Naturales y Flora y Fauna Silvestre" (Law on the Conservation of Natural Spaces and Wild Flora and Fauna) was published in 1989 and the autonomous communities acquired the powers for enacting their own hunting laws.

== Modalities ==
=== Big-game hunting ===
The game species that fall under the umbrella of the term "big-game" sometimes differ from one country to another. In Spain, the benchmark is for species that in the adult state are larger than a fox (foxes are not included): wild boar, red deer, roe deer, Iberian ibex, Pyrenean and Cantabrian chamois, Fallow deer, mouflon, arrui and boc.

==== Montería ====
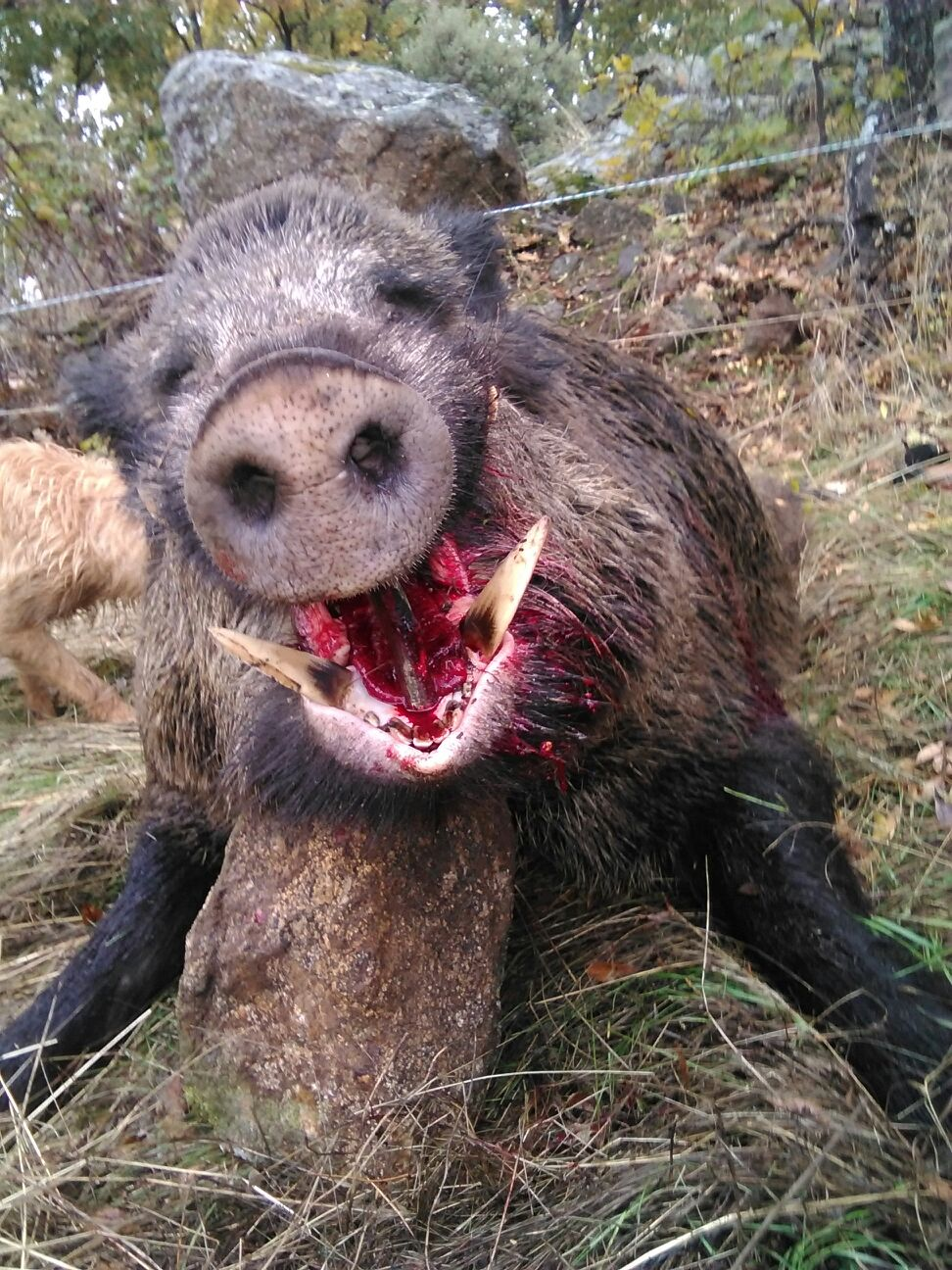
A male wild boar shot at a montería in Castile and León

Of this modality of driven-hunt with over 300 years of history, there are two variants practiced in Spain.

In the best-known variant, "montería española", practiced in almost the entire peninsula, the hunters (called "monteros") are placed in pegs surrounding a "mancha" (area of more or less thick forest where the animals take refuge) arranged in lines (called "armadas") that surround the perimeter. Once all the hunters are positioned, a series of "rehalas" (packs of around 20 dogs) begin to move the hunt through the "mancha" to force the game into the positions of the hunters so these may shoot them.

In this variant, the different "aramdas" in which the pegs are positioned are given the following names depending on their position:

- Cierre (closure): it is a line of pegs that closes the hunting area to prevent the game from escaping without a chance of being shot.
- Traviesa: it is a line of pegs that crosses through the interior of the hunting area.

In the other variant, the "montería norteña", more typical of northern Spain, before placing the pegs, the animal beds are searched with leashed dogs (mainly hounds). Knowing the location of the animals to be hunted, the pegs are placed based on the assumed escape routes etc.

Once the hunt is over, the so-called "junta de carnes" (literally "meat gathering") is held, and here the "arrieros" (porters) will display the animals harvested during the montería so that the hunters can observe the general result of the event and take some pictures.

==== Rececho ====
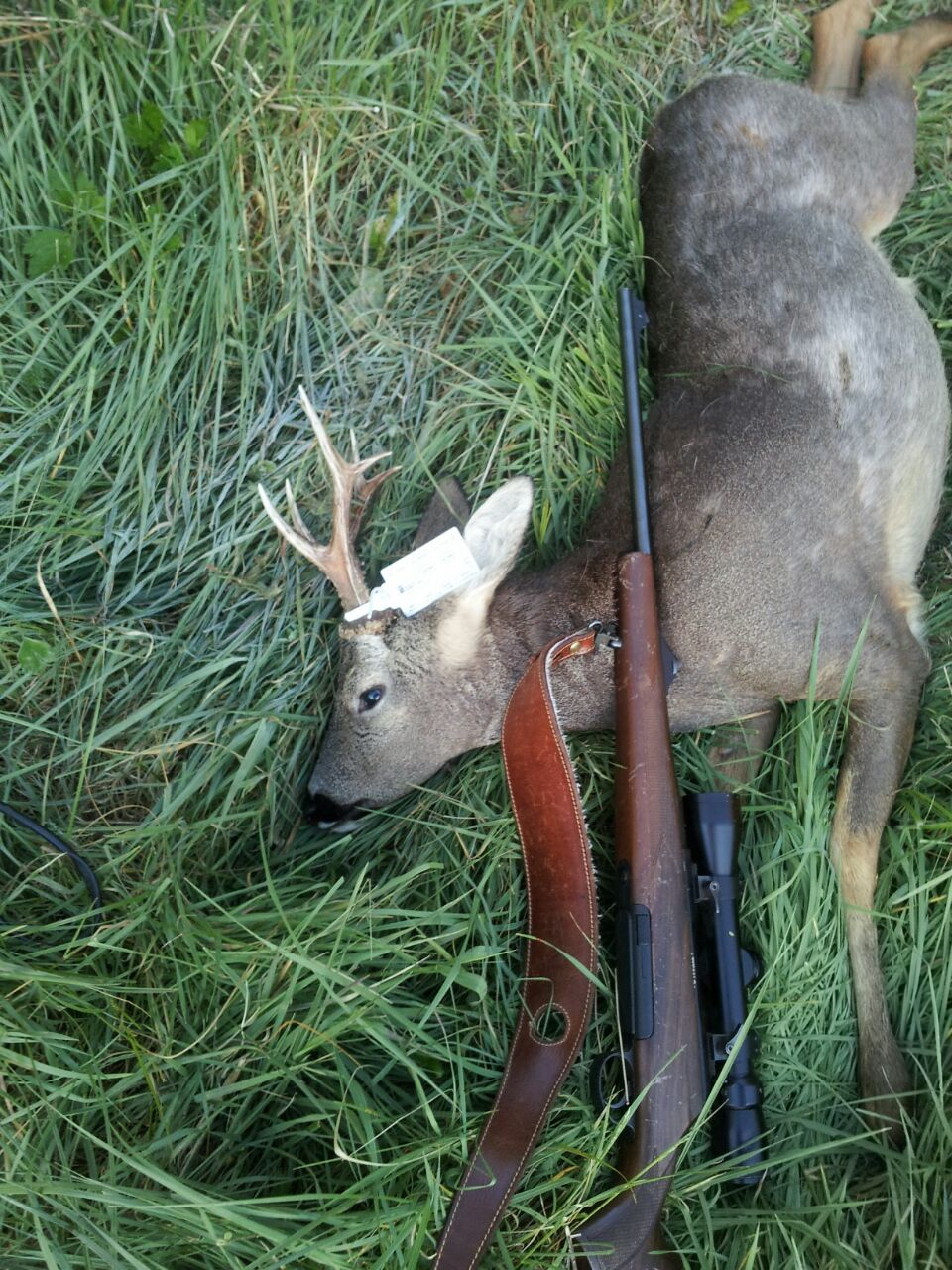
Male roe deer with its respective tag (precinto), shot in "rececho" in Ávila

Known in English as stalking, it consists of approaching a previously selected animal. It is the modality that requires the most physical effort from the hunter, since he must be travel some distances to locate the animal and reach an optimal shooting range, without the animal perceiving his presence. This modality is characterized by being the most selective of all. From the beginning, the hunter knows with certainty the animal he is looking for, as well as its sex and approximate age.

==== Espera ====
The hunter awaits in silence in a stand or position with clear visibility and shooting range to an area frequented by the animals. These may be lured using bait or different methods of attraction.

=== Small-game hunting ===
Small-game animals are those that are smaller than a fox (including) in their adulthood, most of which are birds, rabbits, hares and mustelidae.

==== Caza en mano ====
The small-game equivalent of a "rececho" or stalking, hunting 'in-hand' contemplates the hunter walking in search of the animal, normally accompanied by one or several dogs to help locate the game.

==== Ojeo ====
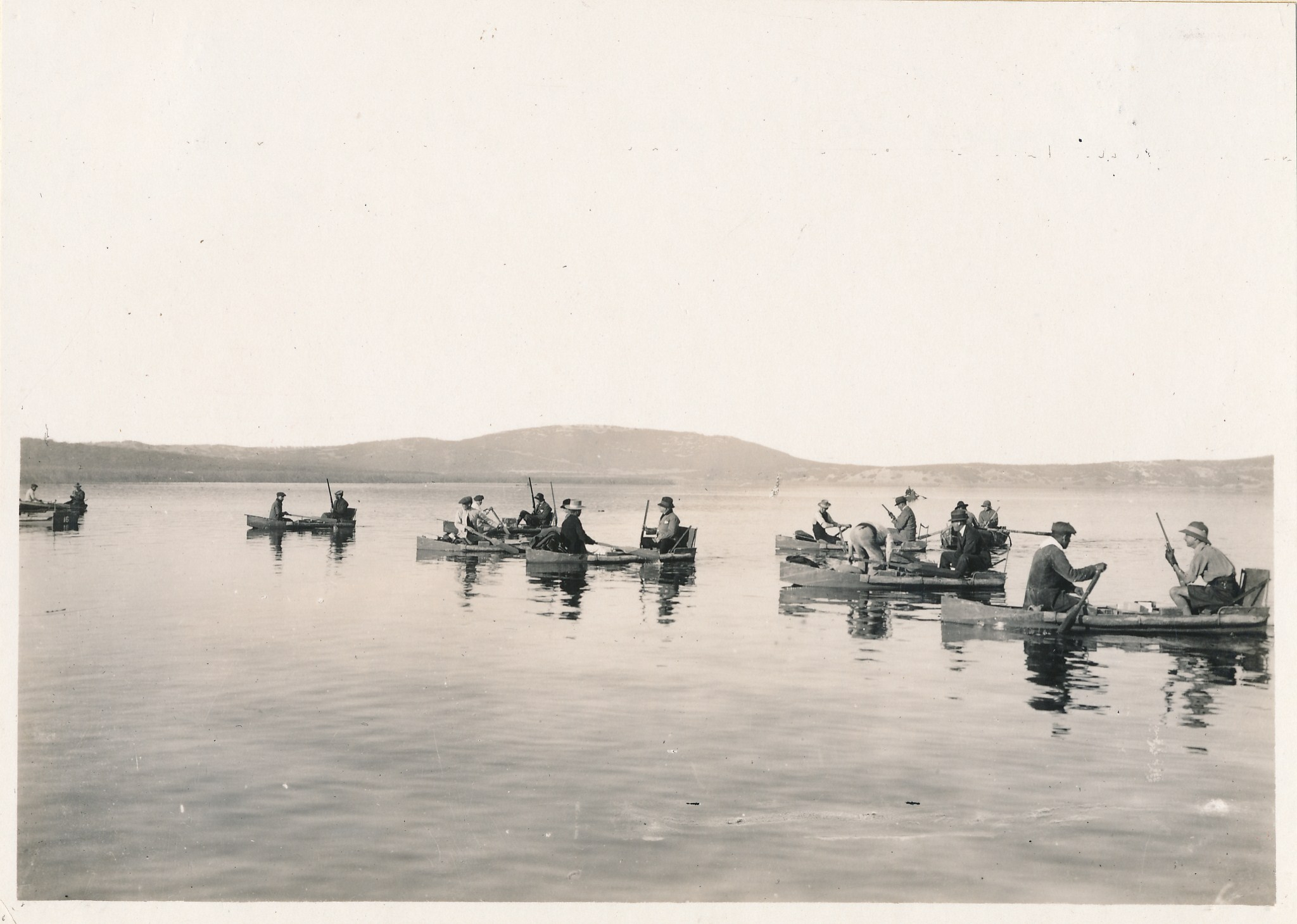
A duck "ojeo" in Medina-Sidonia, c. 1930

The small-game equivalent of a montería, it is a type of driven-hunt where beaters and dogs will move birds into the pegs so that these may be shot by the hunters. Similar to the pheasant hunts in England and the rest of Europe.

Red-legged partridges are the most common species hunted at "ojeos". The elevated prices and large amounts of shot birds (over 2,000 at times) that have become customary at "ojeos" in Spain are subject to some controversy. In 1959, dictator Francisco Franco and a group of hunting enthusiasts shot a record 4,608 partridges in one morning at Santa Cruz de Mudela.

==== Reclamo ====
This type of hunting, known in English as decoy hunting, involves the use of birdcalling and other techniques in order to lure the animal close enough to be shot.

==== Cetrería ====
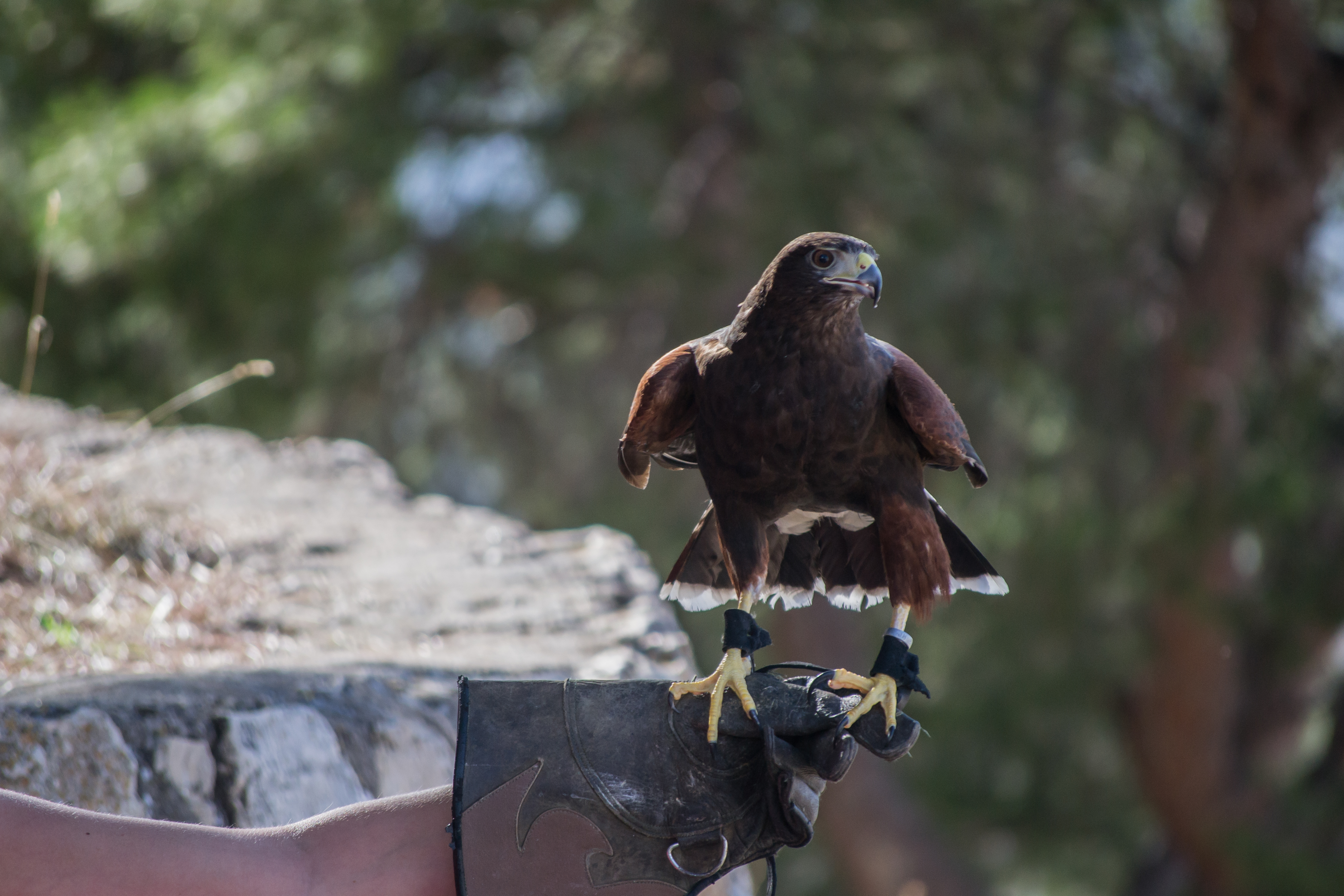
A trained Harris's hawk in Valle de Ayora

The hunt involving a bird of prey. Spain is known for its peregrine falcons, which are the most sought-after bird of prey.

== Finca ==
A "finca" is the term used for estates in Spain, and typically one with a sporting lodge, farmhouse or estate building present, and often adjacent to a woodland or plantation.

Due to its extensive size, Spain has thousands of private fincas, many over 1,000 hectares. The largest finca in Spain is "Valdepuercas" (18,000 hectares), and belongs to José María Aristrain, who was the owner of Arcelor prior to its merger with Mittal. Other very large renowned hunting fincas include "La Garganta" of the Duke of Westminster (15,000 hectares), "Las Lomas" of the Mora-Figueroa family (12,000 hectares) or "El Castañar" of the Duke of Pastrana (11,500 hectares).

Prices of fincas have gone up significantly over time. In 2016, Sheikh Mansour acquired the finca "Los Quintos de San Martín", a 8,000-hectare falconry haven near Valencia de las Torres, Extremadura, for €55 million.

== See also ==
- Big-game hunting

== Bibliography ==
- Anderson, Robert S. (1984). 1984 Gun Digest Hunting Annual. DBI Books Inc. ISBN 978-09-10676-68-7.
- Pérez-González, Javier; Hidalgo de Trucios, Sebastián; Sánchez, Carlos; Rengifo Gallego, Juan Ignacio (April 30, 2023). "Women in the Hunt: A More Useful and Sustainable Hunt for Biodiversity?". Sustainability. 15 (9): 7439. doi:10.3390/su15097439. hdl:10662/40375.
- Priego, Count of (2017). Cazadores Españoles del Siglo XX. Turner Publicaciones. ISBN 978-84-16714-29-2.
