= La Garganta (finca) =

Finca in Ciudad Real, Castile-La Mancha, Spain

Coordinates: 38°28′44″N 04°27′10″W

La Garganta (Spanish for "the throat", or "gully") is a private estate, or finca, of around 15,000 hectares (37,000 acres) in extent, located in the rugged Sierra Morena, in rural Ciudad Real Province, in the region of Castile-La Mancha, Spain. It extends over lands belonging administratively to the municipalities of Almodovar del Campo and Brazatortas between the town of Conquista and the hamlet of Minas del Horcajo. Around 2003 it was bought on lease and renovated by Gerald Grosvenor, 6th Duke of Westminster. Prior to Grosvenor's acquisition, the estate was property of the Duke of Bavaria.

La Garganta is the largest privately owned hunting estate in Europe, and occupies a surface area larger than the entire city of Barcelona.

== History ==
The property was formerly owned by the British mining company Rio Tinto, which mined the hills for a variety of minerals. Since the early 20th century it was converted to a hunting ground by a consortium of European landowners. They managed it through the company Villamagna SA, before the mostly aristocratic German owners started leasing it to Gerald Grosvenor.

== Infrastructure ==
In 2007 it was reported that the private accommodation consists of six large villas, some in the process of renovation, besides accommodation for nearly 100 staff. A converted railway station allows for rail access, while the headquarters is supplied with its own petrol station to service a fleet of over 20 jeeps. Economic activity includes production of olives, cereal and cork.

Strict security was reported, while all but one of the former public entrance roads have been closed. This recent move towards higher exclusivity and privacy proved controversial with some members of the public and local environmentalists.

== Wildlife ==
The hilly and extensively forested property, has a perimeter of about 40 miles and ranges from 585 to 1,266 meters in altitude. Its wildlife is described as diverse by European standards. Despite low and erratic rainfall, significant woodlands occur, which include cork oak, strawberry trees, poplars and alder, the latter limited to the river valley. These woods are flanked by pine forests in the north and east, besides commercial olives and exotic eucalypts.

The estate is stocked with boar, Iberian red deer, Iberian ibex, mouflons, fallow deer and partridge, for hunting. The numbers of smaller species like partridge, hares and rabbits are encouraged for the sake of raptors. Rare wildlife like the Iberian lynx, black stork and Spanish imperial eagle occur, while black, griffon and Egyptian vultures, and the golden eagle are resident species. The estate manager as of 2007 was José María Tercero. Prior to the 1990s, the Iberian wolf was also a species of the estate.

== See also ==
- Hunting in Spain
- Montería (hunt)
