= Balearean boc =

Species of wild goat endemic to the Balearic Islands

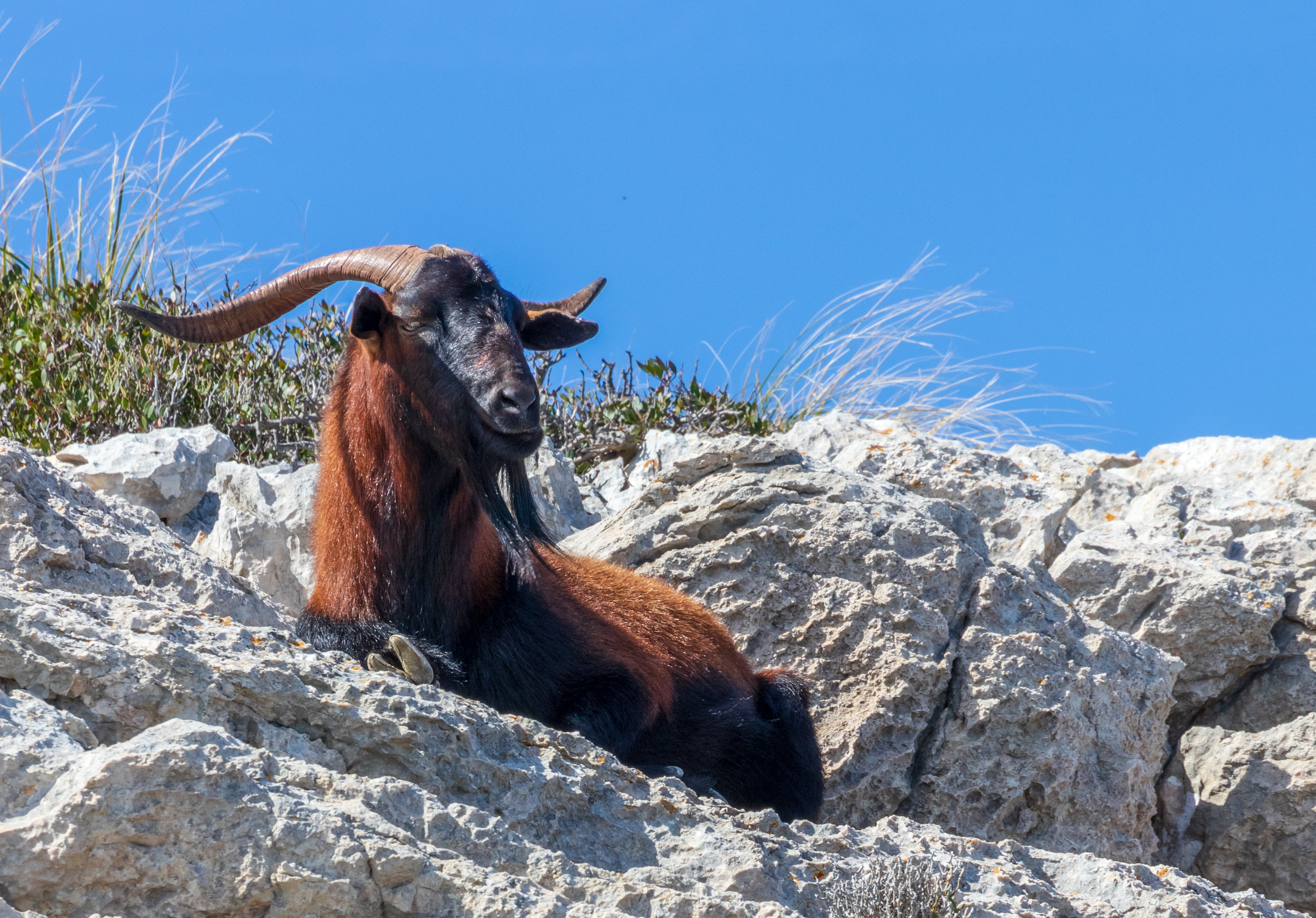
A boc in Alcúdia, Spain

The Balearean boc (Capra hircus var. majorcan) also known as the Majorcan wild goat, is a caprid present on the Balearic Islands in Spain. Being the only big game species that exists in the Balearic Islands, it has attracted attention from international hunters, particularly from the United States, where the SCI included it as a game species in 2004. The CIC and the National Board of Trophy Hunting Homologation included it in 2009 and 2008 respectively.

== Description ==
The Balearean boc has reddish fur with a black underside, forehead, and spine. It also has large spiraling horns protruding from its head.

== Range ==
Balearean bocs naturally occur exclusively in the Balearic Islands, and in no other area in the globe. They are particularly abundant in Alcúdia and Formentor.

== Habitats ==
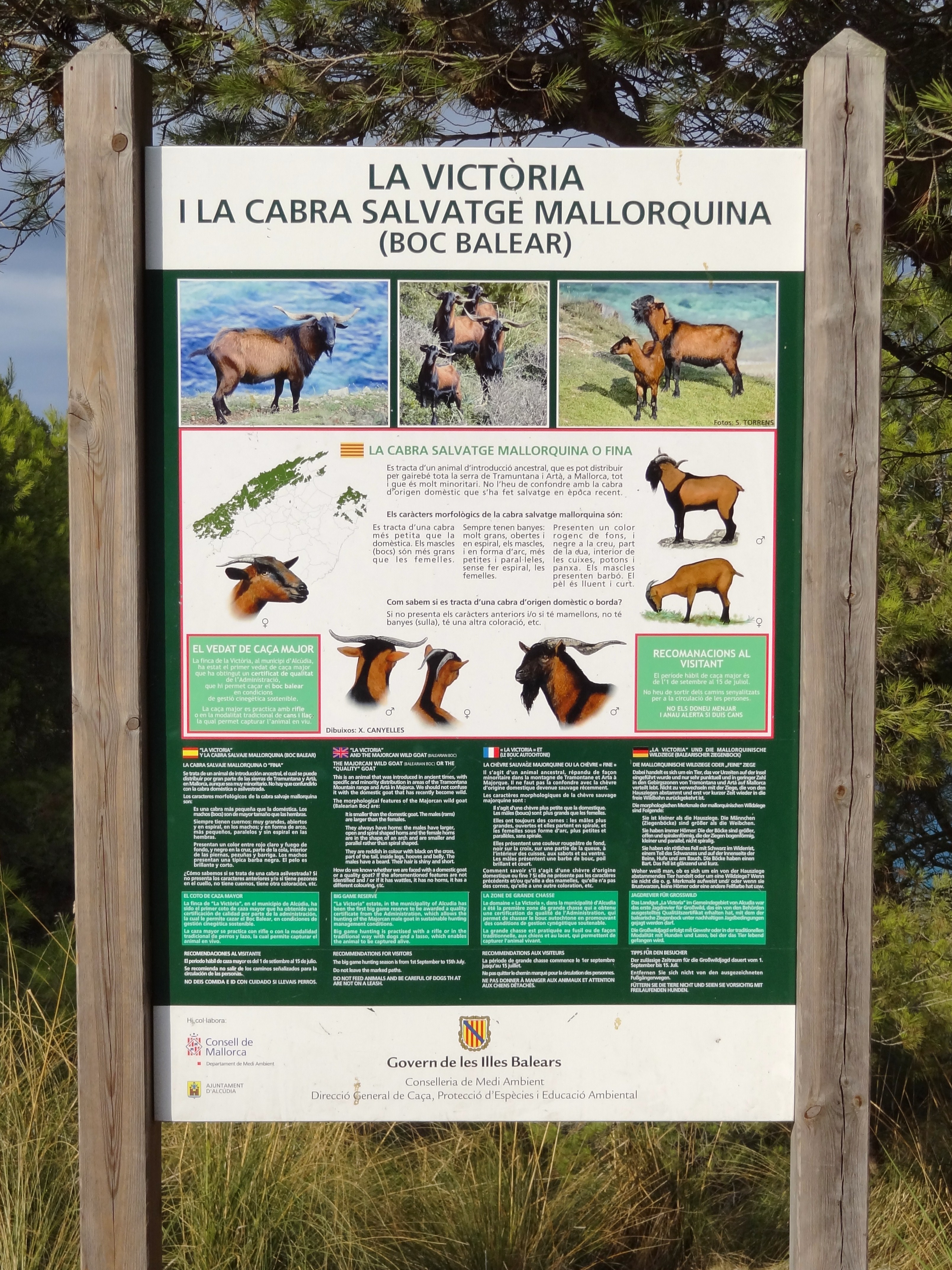
An information card on the bocs in Alcúdia

Balearean bocs are found in arid mountainous areas where they graze and browse grasses, bushes, and lichens. They are well adapted to their habitat, which consist of steep, rocky mountains and canyons.

== Behavior ==
Balearean bocs often flee at the first sign of danger, typically running uphill, contrary to the common misconception that views them as tame. They are able to obtain some of their metabolic water from food, but if liquid water is available, they drink and wallow in it.

== See also ==
- Myotragus balearicus, a goat antelope that was endemic to the Balearic islands prior to the arrival of humans.

== Bibliography ==
- Seguí, Bartomeu (2005). "The Majorcan wild goat: Origin, genetics, morphology, ecological notes and taxonomic implications". Bolleti de la Societat d'Historia Natural de les Balears. 48. Societat d'Història Natural de les Balears.
