= Santa Elena de Jamuz =

Coordinates: 42°16′N 5°53′W

Santa Elena de Jamuz, Spain
- municipality
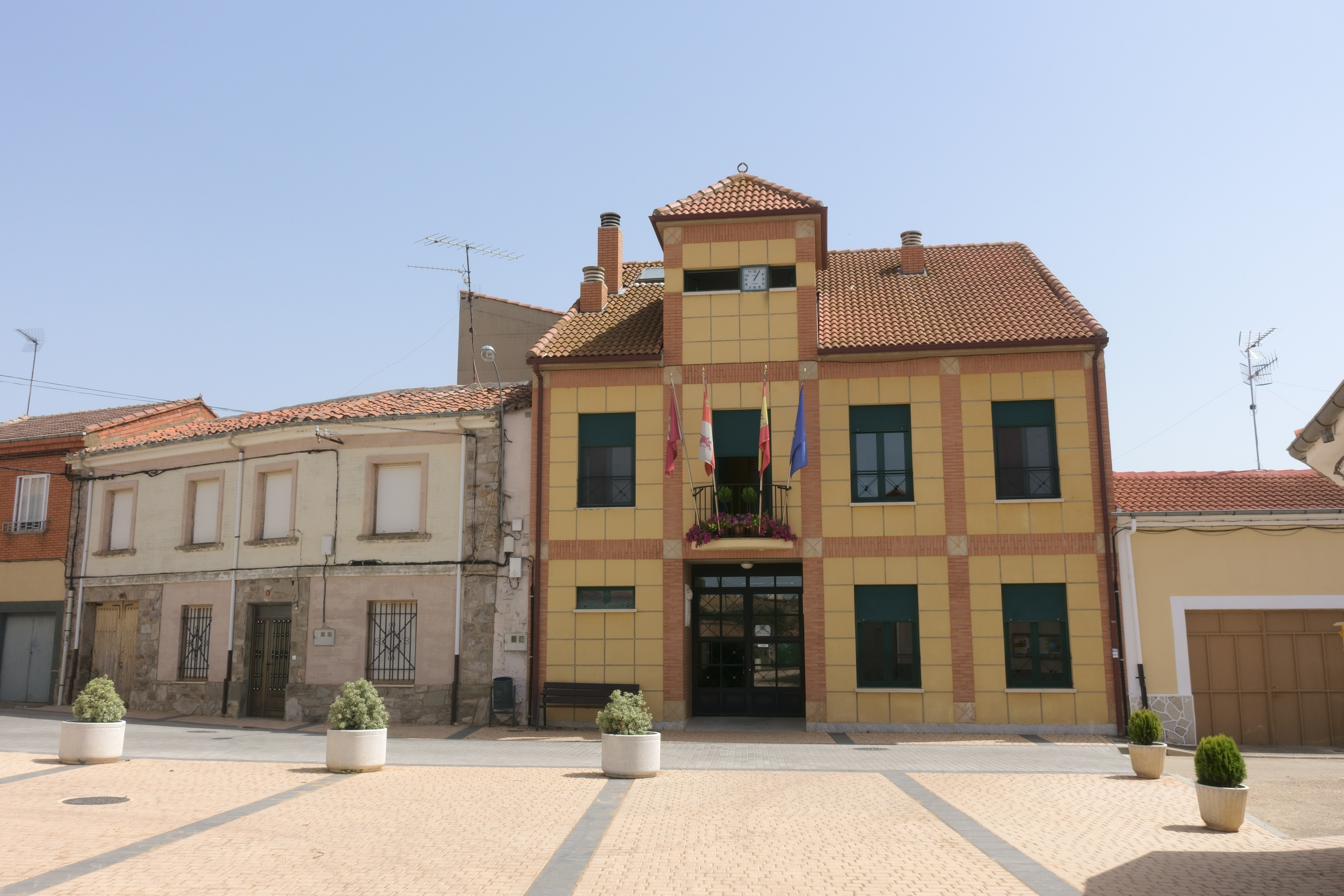
- Town Hall of Santa Elena de Jamuz, León, Spain

- Coat of arms
- Interactive map of Santa Elena de Jamuz, Spain
- Country: Spain
- Autonomous community: Castile and León
- Province: León
- Municipality: Santa Elena de Jamuz

Area
  - Total: 62 km^{2} (24 sq mi)

Population (2025-01-01)
  - Total: 1,021
  - Density: 16/km^{2} (43/sq mi)
- Time zone: UTC+1 (CET)
  - Summer (DST): UTC+2 (CEST)

Santa Elena de Jamuz is a municipality located in the province of León, Castile and León, Spain. According to the 2004 census (INE), the municipality has a population of 1,315 inhabitants.
