= Viscount of Salinas =

Viscountcy of Salinas
- Creation date: 1688
- Created by: Charles II
- Peerage: Peerage of Spain
- First holder: Francisco de Carvajal y Loaysa, 1st Viscount of Salinas
- Present holder: Santiago Satrústegui y Unceta, 10th Viscount of Salinas
- Heir apparent: Santiago Satrústegui y Pérez de Villaamil

Viscount of Salinas (Spanish: Vizconde de Salinas) is a hereditary title in the Peerage of Spain, granted in 1688 by Charles II to Francisco de Carvajal, 7th Lord of Salinas de los Mazones, 9th Lord of Sobrinos in Talavera de la Reina and knight of the Order of Alcántara.

== Viscounts of Salinas ==
1. Francisco de Carvajal y Loaysa, 1st Viscount of Salinas
2. Gutierre de Meneses y Carvajal, 2nd Viscount of Salinas
3. ?
4. Pedro de Monroy y Meneses, 4th Viscount of Salinas
5. Antonio Javier Rodríguez de Monroy y Meneses, 5th Viscount of Salinas
6. Francisca María Rodríguez de Monroy y Meneses, 6th Viscountess of Salinas
7. Petra Rodríguez de Monroy y Meneses, 7th Viscountess of Salinas
8. José María Unceta y Berriozábal, 8th Viscount of Salinas
9. María del Pilar Unceta y Urigoitia, 9th Viscount of Salinas
10. Santiago Satrústegui y Unceta, 10th Viscount of Salinas

== See also ==
- Spanish nobility
