= Las Batuecas =

Valley of Las Batuecas
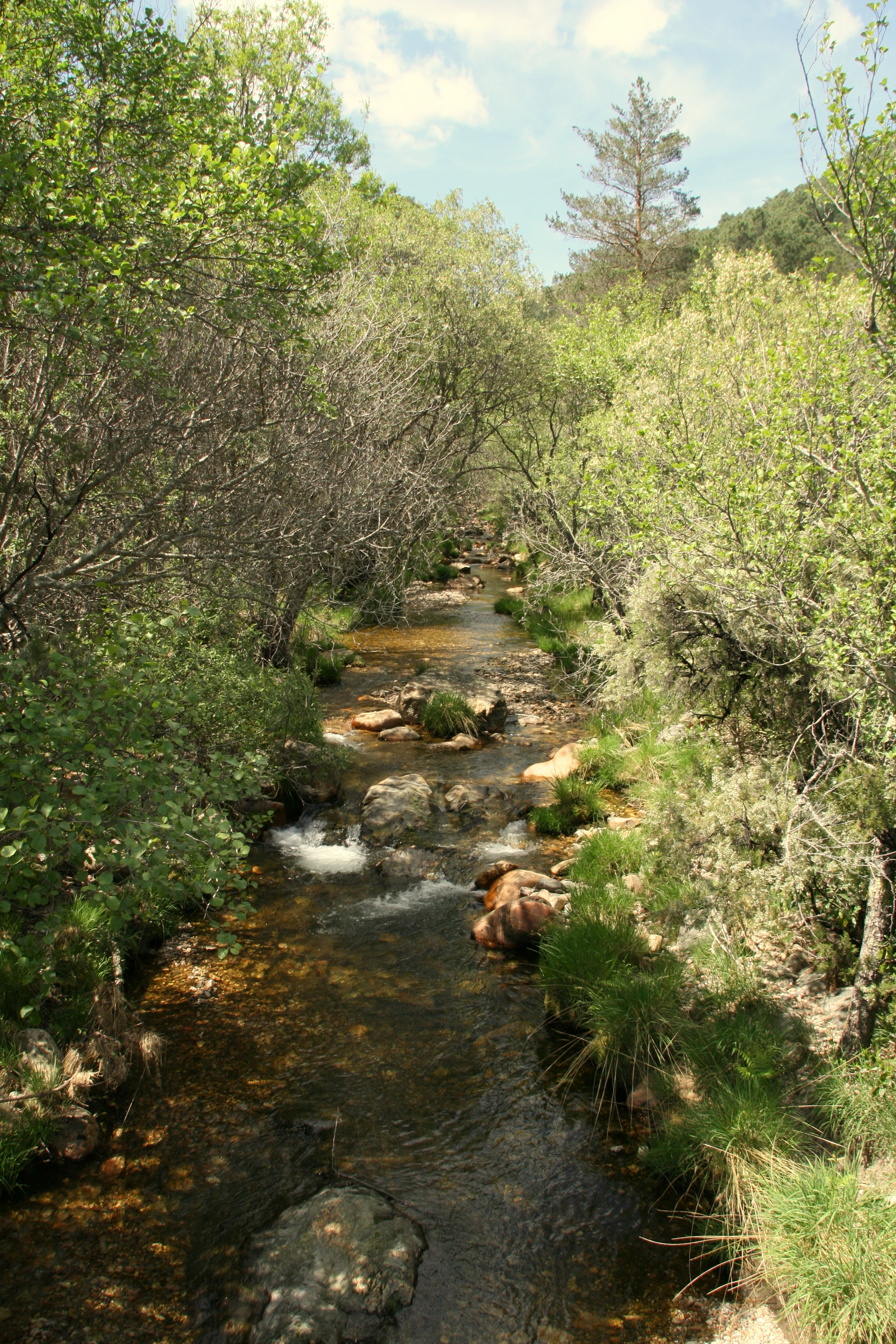
- Interactive map of Valley of Las Batuecas
- 40.453034°N 6.120071°W
- Location: Sierra de Francia, Salamanca
- Nearest city: La Alberca

Las Batuecas is a Spanish valley region of the Sierra de Francia in Salamanca Province, Castilla y León.

It is located in the vicinity of La Alberca and is named after the river that runs through Las Batuecas.

It has a monastery of cloistered secluded monks called the Discalced Carmelites.

== See also ==
- Río Batuecas
- Peña de Francia
