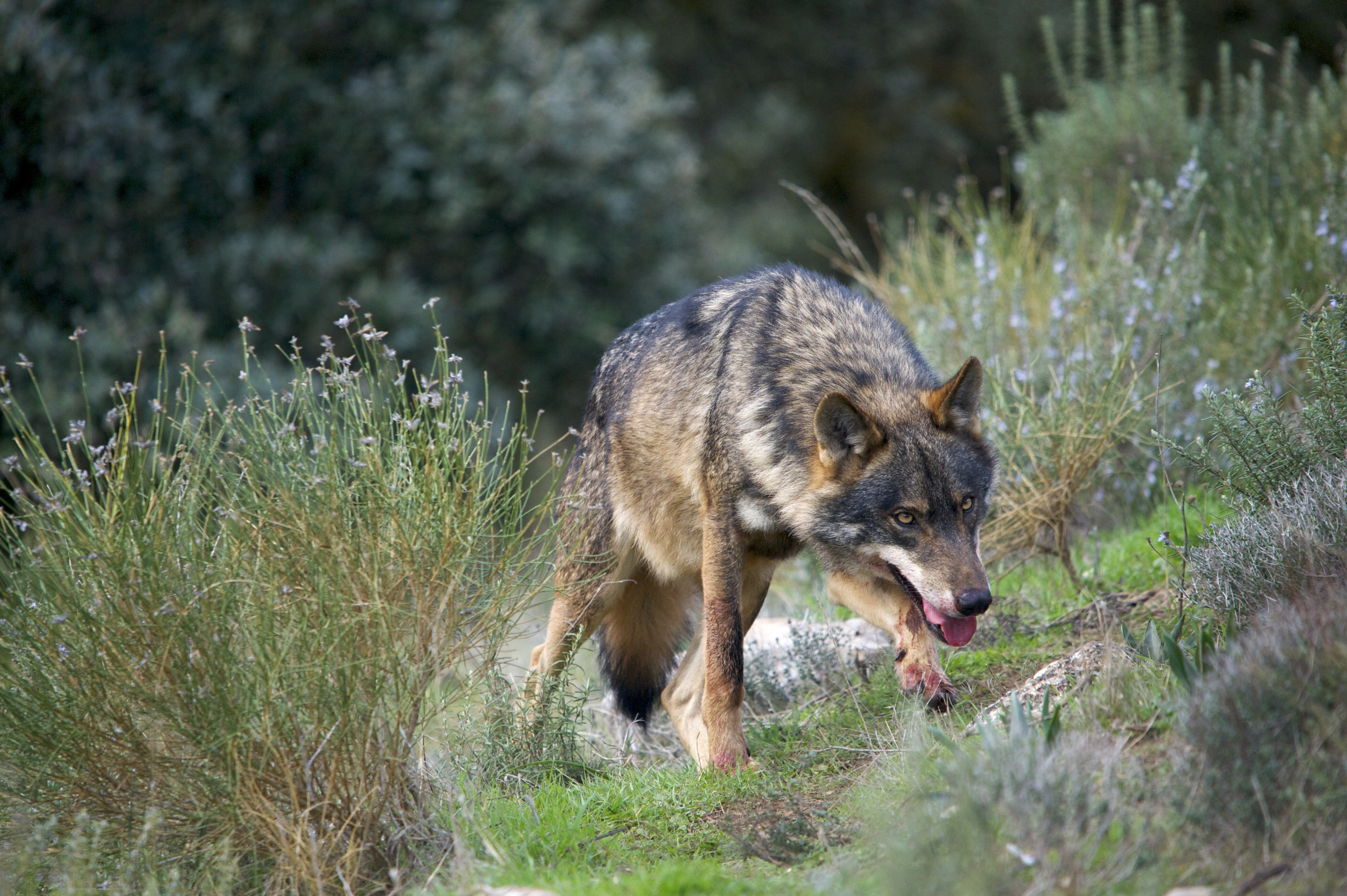

Conservation status
- Vulnerable (IUCN 3.1)

Scientific classification
- Kingdom: Animalia
- Phylum: Chordata
- Class: Mammalia
- Order: Carnivora
- Family: Canidae
- Genus: Canis
- Species: C. lupus
- Subspecies: C. l. signatus

Trinomial name
- Canis lupus signatus Cabrera, 1907

= Iberian wolf =

Subspecies of carnivore

The Iberian wolf (Canis lupus signatus, or Canis lupus lupus, Spanish: Lobo ibérico, Portuguese: Lobo-ibérico), is a subspecies of grey wolf. It inhabits the northwest of the Iberian Peninsula, which includes northwestern Spain and northern Portugal, housing 2,200 to 2,700 wolves. They form the largest wolf population in Western Europe.

Due to population controls and damage to livestock, Iberian wolves were the only Western European subspecies of wolf whose hunting remained legal, until February 2021 when hunting was banned in Spain. The hunting permits given in Spain over the period 2019–2021 were for a quota of 339 animals in total, strictly in the region north of the Douro river. Along with the difficulty of their hunt by virtue of their vigilant nature and the rarity of their sightings, they were strongly desired by many European hunters as a big-game trophy. In March 2025, the Congress approved hunting of the Iberian wolf north of the Douro River again, due to a significant growth in population and the resulting increase in livestock losses.

== Taxonomy ==
The Iberian wolf Canis lupus signatus Cabrera 1907 is classified as Canis lupus lupus by Mammal Species of the World. Some authors claim that the south-eastern Spanish wolf, last sighted in Murcia in the 1930s, was a different subspecies called Canis lupus deitanus. It was even smaller and more reddish in color, without dark spots. Both subspecies were nominated by the Spanish-born zoologist Ángel Cabrera in 1907.

The Iberian wolf's skull morphometrics, mtDNA, and microsatellites differ from other European wolves. In 2016, a study of mitochondrial DNA sequences of both modern and ancient wolves indicated that in Europe, the two most genetically distinct haplotypes form the Italian wolf, and separately, the Iberian wolf. The National Center for Biotechnology Information/Genbank lists the Iberian wolf under Canis lupus signatus.

In 2020, a genomic study of Eurasian wolves found that the populations of the Dinaric Alps-Balkan Mountains region, the Iberian peninsula, and Italy diverged from each other 10,500 years ago followed by negligible gene flow between them. Their long-term isolation may explain the morphological and genetic differences between them.

== Description ==
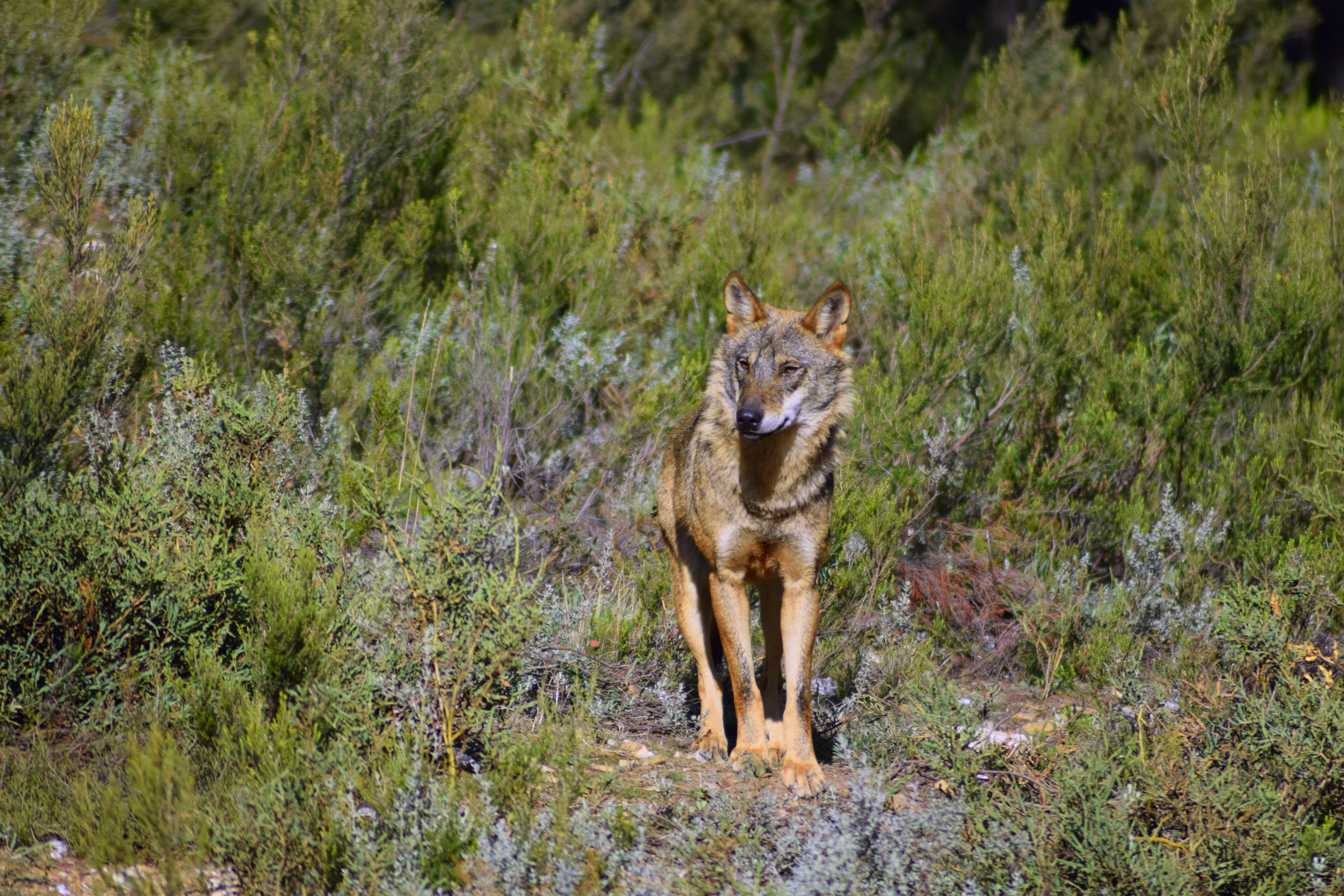
White stripes on the snouts and black marks on the front legs are distinguishing markings of the subspecies

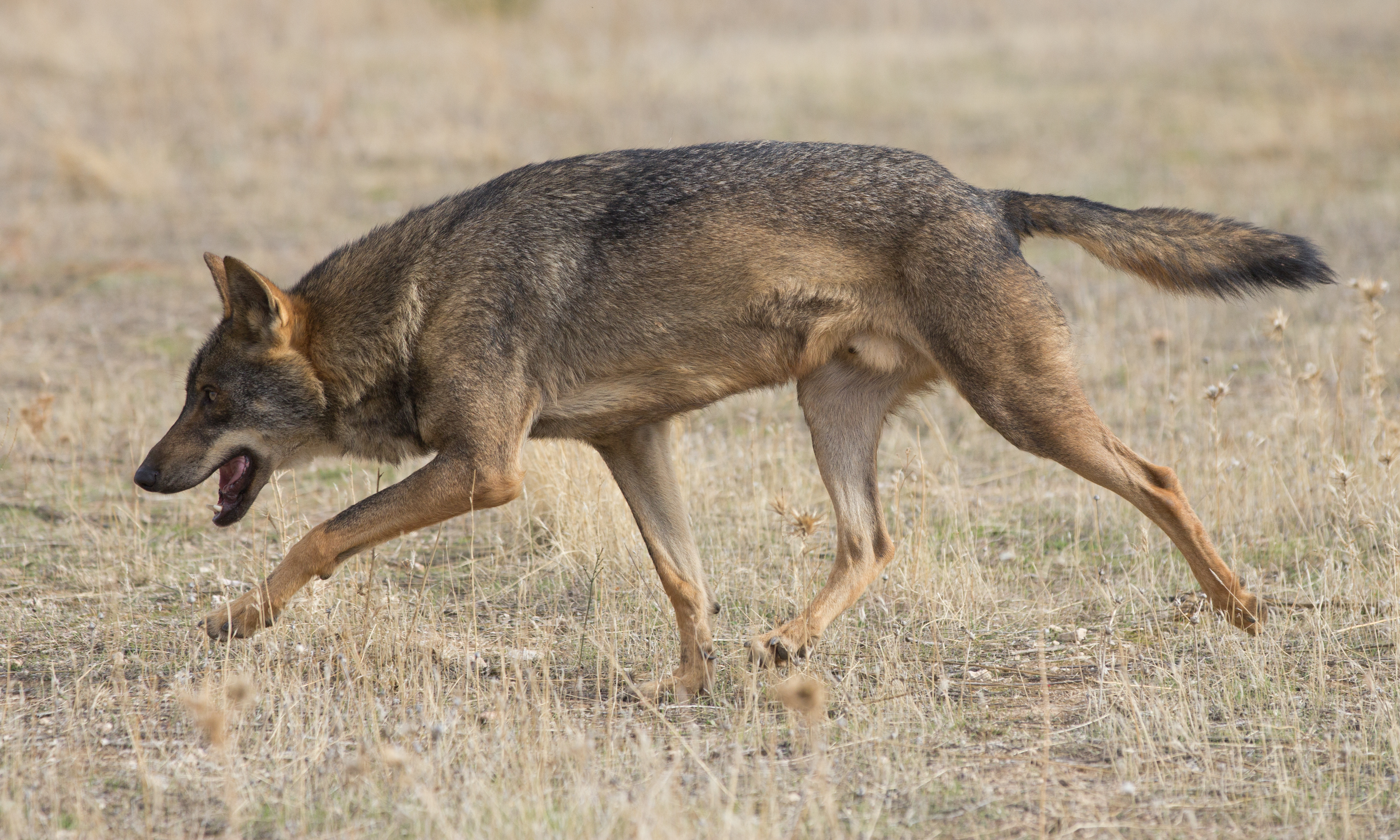
Iberian wolf with summer fur in semi-captivity in the Community of Madrid

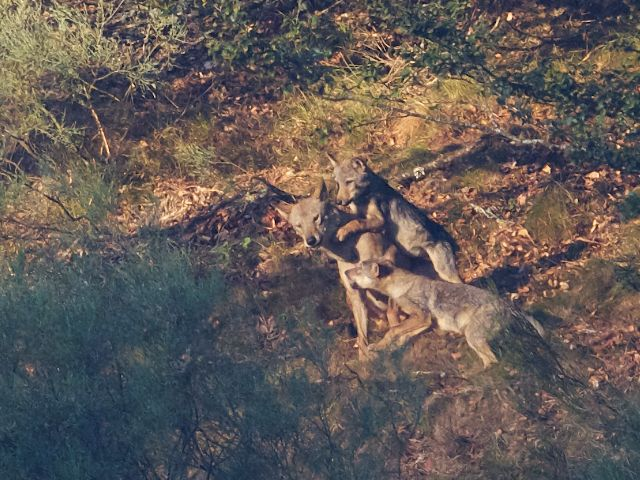
Iberian wolf pups stimulating their mother, the leader of the pack, to regurgitate

Cabrera identified two types of wolves living in Spain. In comparison, C. l. lupus had a pale, undefined stroke on the cheek that contrasts with the white on the throat; C. l. signatus had a white stroke on the cheek that joins the white throat and with a reddish snout; and C. l. deitanus was much smaller and with more colouring than the wolves to the north. C. l. signatus is described by Cabrera as being 140–180 cm (55–71 in) in head and body length, and 66–72 cm (26–28 in) height at the shoulders.

The Iberian wolf differs from the more common Eurasian wolf with its slighter frame, white marks on the upper lips, the dark marks on the tail, and a pair of dark marks in its front legs that give it its subspecies name, signatus ("marked"). The subspecies differentiation may have developed at the end of the Pleistocene Ice Ages due to the isolation of the Iberian Peninsula when glacier barriers grew in the Pyrenees and eventually reached the Gulf of Biscay in the west and the Mediterranean in the east.

Height is 70 cm (28 in) on average and body length 110–140 cm (43–55 in). Females weigh 25–35 kg (55–77 lb) while Males weigh 35–55 kg (77–121 lb).

== Diet ==
The Iberian wolf lives in small packs. It is considered to be beneficial because it keeps the population of wild boars stable, thus allowing some respite to the endangered capercaillie populations which suffer greatly from boar predation. It also eats rabbits, roe deer, red deer, ibexes and even small carnivores and fish, depending on location. In Guadarrama National Park, the Iberian wolf primarily (82%) fed on wild animals, with domesticated animals only making up a small (18%) portion of the diet. Wild boar (44%) and roe deer (35%) were the most important prey items, with ibex (3%) and red deer (0.3%) barely being targeted. The structure and availability of prey populations, as well as the size of its prey, often affects the diet of the Iberian wolf as well, as it has been observed to occasionally consume smaller prey such as rodents and birds. The consumption of unusual prey is often due to varying biodiversity throughout its range.

== Distribution and conservation ==
Wolf populations strongly declined across Europe during the 18th and 19th centuries largely due to human persecution, and by the end of the Second World War they had been eradicated from all of Central Europe and almost all of Northern Europe. Their population decline continued until the 1960s, with isolated populations surviving in Italy, Spain, Portugal, Greece, and Finland. Wolf populations have commenced recovering naturally since then.

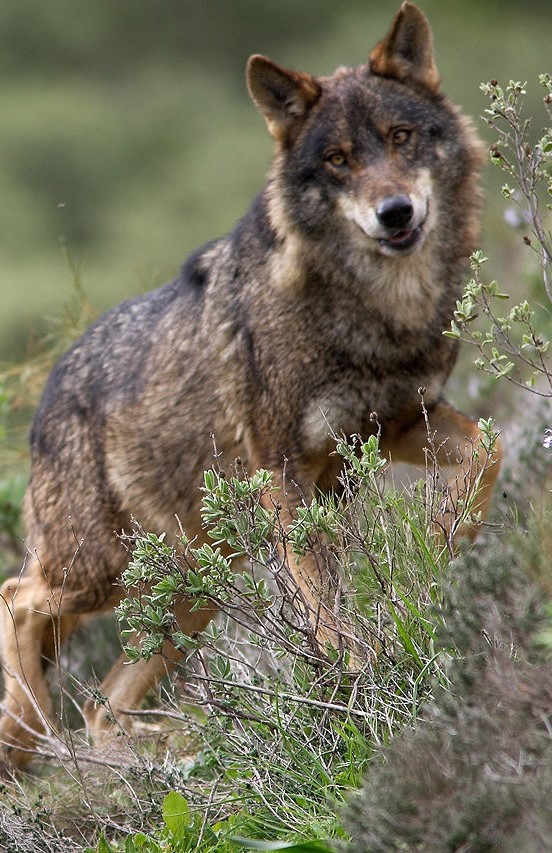
Iberian wolf in Tudela de Duero, Spain

The Iberian wolf consists of over 2,000 individuals in over 350 packs distributed across 140,000 km^{2} (54,000 sq mi). Their densities in some regions are among the highest in Europe, with up to 7 wolves per 100 km^{2} (39 sq mi). In 2018, a study identified that this wolf could be categorised into 11 genetic groups. Four groups were identified in the Portuguese regions of Alto Minho, Alto Trás-os-Montes, and one group located south of the Douro river. Seven groups were identified in the Spanish regions of western Galicia, eastern Galicia, western Asturias, central Asturias, eastern Asturias, south-eastern Asturias, and Castilla y León.

Until the 1930s, Iberian wolves were relatively spread throughout Portugal, but destruction of habitat, loss of wild ungulates and the persecution by humans made it lose most of its territory (from around 44,100 km^{2} (17,000 sq mi) in 1900–1930, to only 16,300 km^{2} (6,300 sq mi) in 2002–2003) though populations have grown to about 29,000 km^{2} (11,000 sq mi) since.

Some Spanish naturalists and conservationists such as Félix Rodríguez de la Fuente called for the end of the hunting and the protection of the animal. Today, the hunting of wolves is banned in Portugal, and in Spain since 2021. The 2003 census estimated the total Iberian population to be 2,000 wolves. Wolves have been reported as returning to Navarre and the Basque Country and to the provinces of Extremadura, Madrid, and Guadalajara. A male wolf was found recently in Catalonia, where the last native wolf was killed in 1929. However, this animal was not a member of the Iberian subspecies, but an Italian wolf (C. l. italicus) migrating from France. As of 2013, an estimated 300 individuals remain in Portugal.

In October 2013, Ecologists in Action called for an urgent review of the Iberian wolf census, which may overestimate their numbers. Later that month, wolf association Lobo Marley sent 198,000 signatures calling for the animal's protection to the European Parliament Committee on Petitions. Over a few weeks in September and October 2013, about 30 puppies and young wolves were killed by hunters in Asturias, León, and Cantabria.

Although hunting is banned in Portugal, about 45% of wolf deaths are due to human activities, including illegal hunting. Calling the rate unsustainable, 10 organisations signed a statement requesting stronger protection.

=== Southern population ===
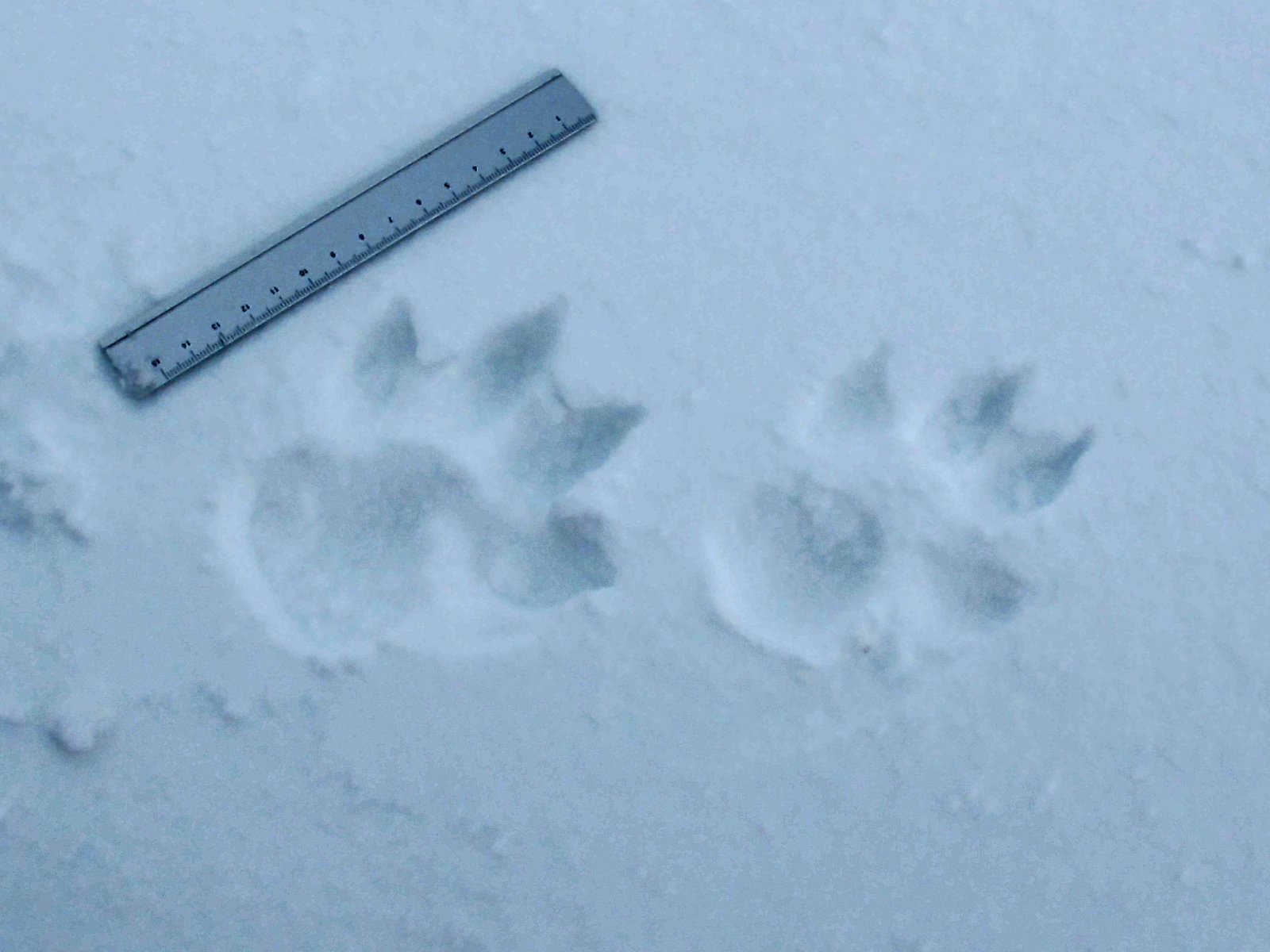
Iberian wolf footprints in the snow

Sierra Morena is a system of rugged mountain ranges in the south of the Iberian Peninsula where a very small wolf population has lived in isolation for half a century. A breeding pair of wolves was last sighted in 2013, however an extensive survey in 2016 could not find a breeding population. The DNA of a road-killed wolf from 2003 indicated high levels of inbreeding and 30% of the genome being that of dog. It is thought that as the population of these wolves declined, the inability to find a mate led to inbreeding and hybridization with dogs. The wolves in this region may now be extinct.
