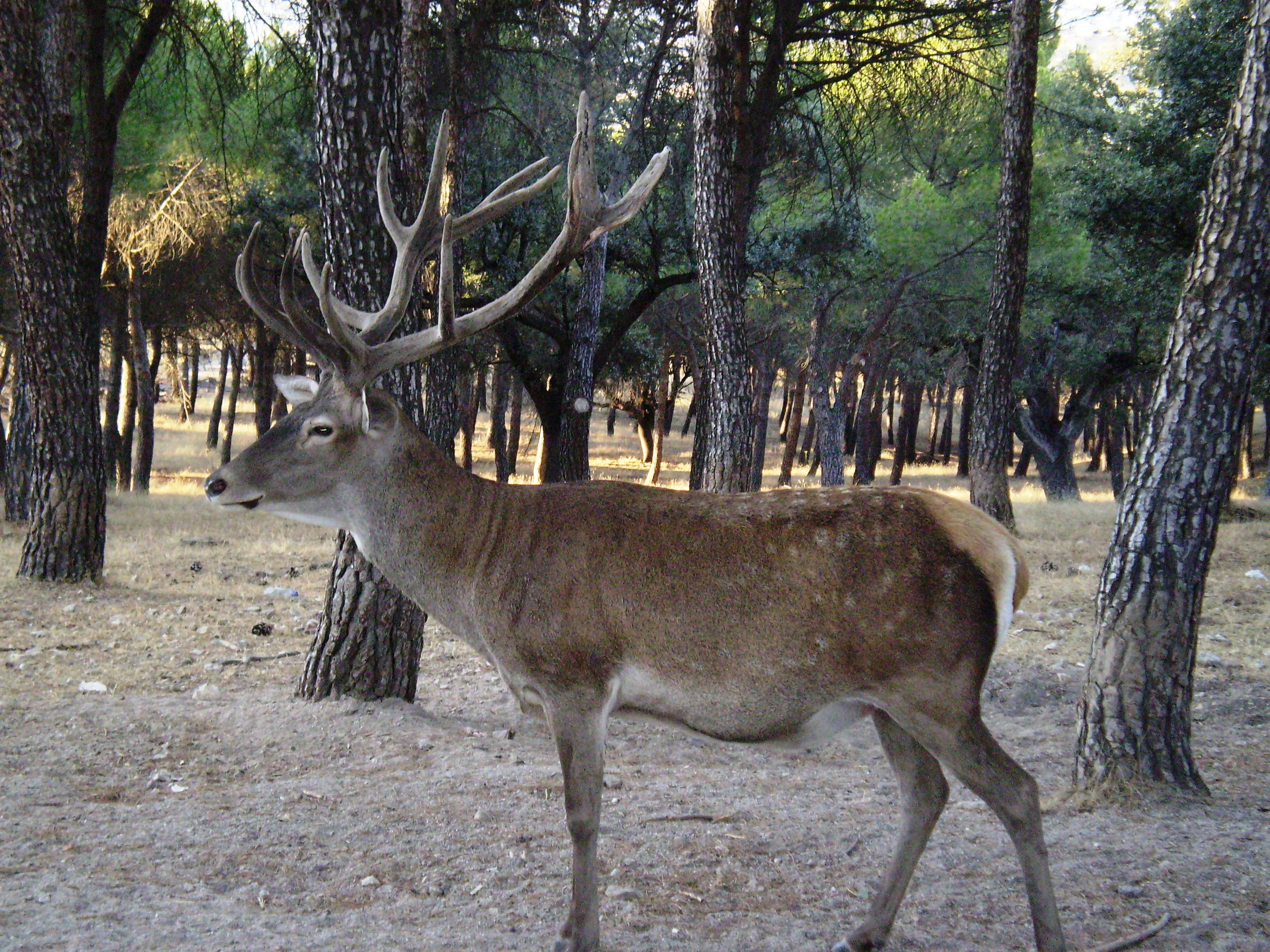

Scientific classification
- Kingdom: Animalia
- Phylum: Chordata
- Class: Mammalia
- Infraclass: Placentalia
- Order: Artiodactyla
- Family: Cervidae
- Genus: Cervus
- Species: C. elaphus
- Subspecies: C. e. hispanicus

Trinomial name
- Cervus elaphus hispanicus Hilzheimer, 1909
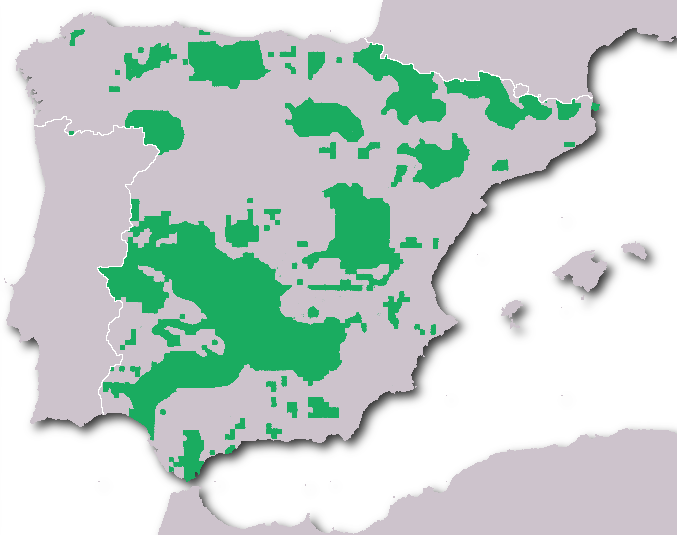
- Distribution area

= Spanish red deer =

Subspecies of deer

The Spanish red deer (Cervus elaphus hispanicus) is a subspecies of the red deer native to Spain. The Spanish red deer is a polygynous subspecies, which means the males have two or more mates; during mating season, males show a dark ventral area in their abdomen. The males usually defend the mating territories on the females' favored location.
